= Serrate radar detector =

Serrate was a World War II Allied radar detection and homing device that was used by night fighters to track Luftwaffe night fighters equipped with the earlier UHF-band BC and C-1 versions of the Lichtenstein radar. It allowed Royal Air Force (RAF) night fighters to attack their German counterparts, disrupting their attempts to attack RAF bombers.

The first Serrate systems were developed from the AI Mk. IV radar, which just happened to have antennas almost perfectly suited to receiving the Lichtenstein signals. Serrate simply disconnected the display from the radar transmitter and receiver and connected it a receiver tuned to Lichtenstein. This produced a display indicating the direction to the German aircraft, but not the range. By carefully watching the movement of the target on the display the operator could estimate the range in general terms, near or far. When it appeared the target was close enough, the display was reconnected to the AI Mk. IV to provide ranging and directional information during the last moments of the attack.

Serrate operations began by 141 Squadron on the night of 7/8 September 1943. 179 operational sorties yielded 14 claimed fighters shot down, for 3 losses. After that point, the Luftwaffe realized what was happening and quickly introduced new versions of their radars working on different frequencies. Unlike the earlier sets, which just happened to operate on frequencies very close to the British radars, the new sets required new detectors, which took some time to develop. New versions of Serrate were introduced and moved from the Beaufighter to the faster Mosquito but later operations were never as successful as the early ones.

Later intruder operations were often directed by the Perfectos device instead of Serrate. This worked by triggering the German identification friend or foe (IFF) transceivers and receiving the reply on the same antennas as Serrate. As the timing of the request pulse was known, Perfectos revealed both the angle and range to the target, removing the need to switch to radar at the end of the approach.

== Basic concept ==
The AI Mk. IV radar was the first operational aircraft interception (AI) radar. It was used experimentally in April 1940, and entered widespread service in early 1941. These systems used a set of four receiver antennas that were arranged so they were most sensitive in different directions; two were sensitive above or below the aircraft, and the other two to the left and right. The output from these antennas was rapidly switched back and forth on the display, producing two blips for any given target, with the length of the blip indicating the strength of the signal in that direction. By comparing the length of the blips from, say, the upper and lower antennas, the operator could determine if the target was above or below his fighter.

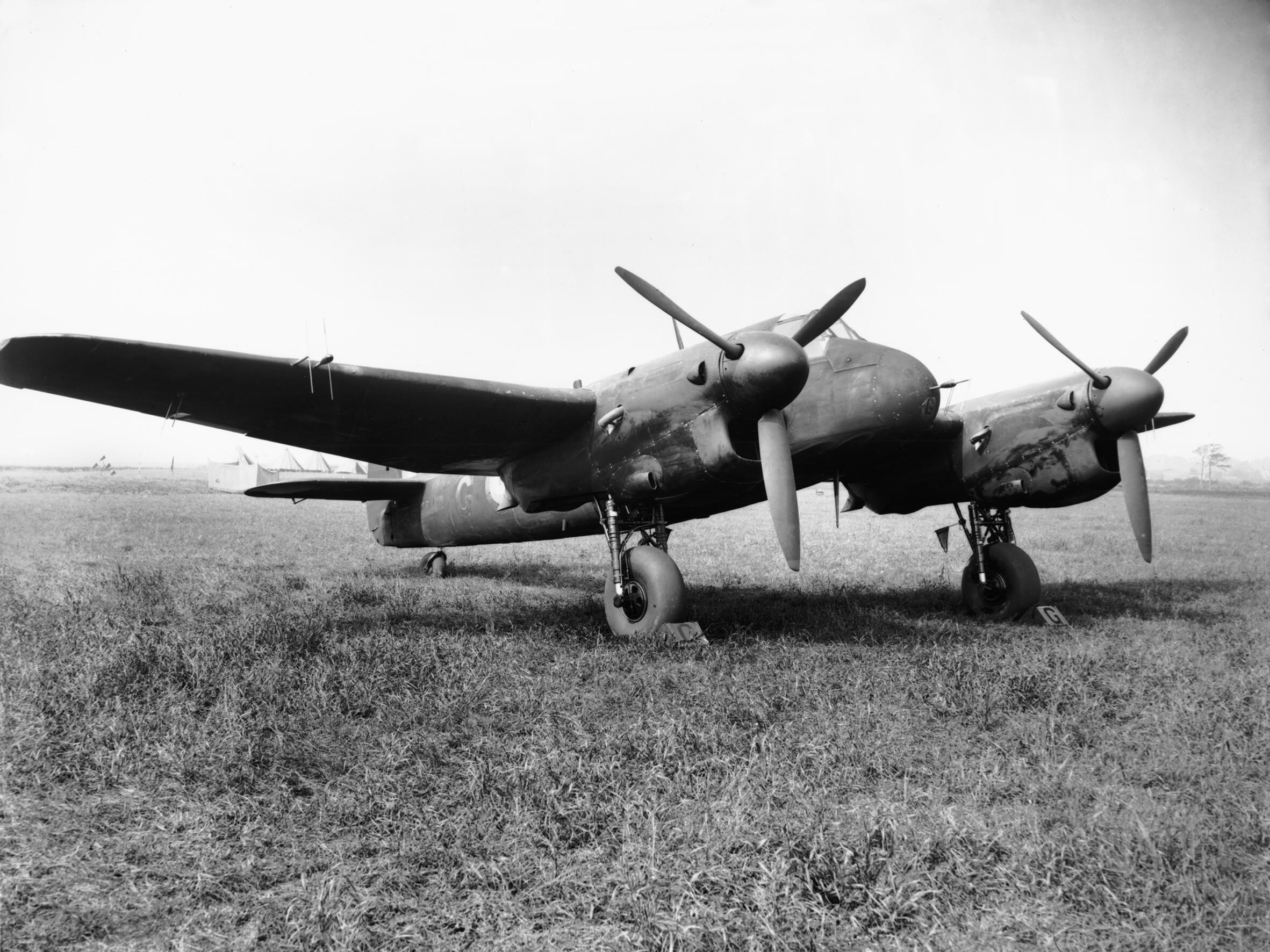
A Beaufighter fitted with Mark IV radar, the transmitting antenna may be seen on the nose of the aircraft, the receiving antenna are fitted to the wings

For purely practical reasons, the antennas were shorter than ideal. A half-wave dipole for the system's 1.5 m wavelength signals should be about 75 cm but antennas of this size produced considerable drag on the aircraft. As gain was not a limiting issue due to other limitations of the system, smaller antennas were adopted, about 30 cm long. By chance, the Germans selected a 50 cm wavelength for their own AI radars, which made the Mark IV antennas almost perfectly suited for receiving their signals. The suggestion was made early on that the system could be modified to display the signals from the German radars simply by connecting the antennas and display to a receiver tuned to the German frequencies.

By late 1941 a new generation of radars was appearing that were based on the new cavity magnetron instead of the traditional tube-based electronics of the Mk. IV. These operated at much shorter wavelengths, about 9 cm, thus requiring much smaller antennas while also providing much higher angular resolution. The production AI Mk. VIII radar version became widespread by late 1942 and were installed primarily on the Mosquito, leaving the problem of what to do with the older Bristol Beaufighters mounting Mk. IV. This difficulty arose at the time that the use of the H2S radar was being debated within Bomber Command, with concern that an aircraft lost over Europe would reveal the secret of the magnetron to the Germans.

At this point the idea of using the Mk. IV-equipped Beaufighters as intruder aircraft was once again raised. Lacking a magnetron, these presented no security risk, and offered a reasonable way to use obsolete night fighters. This was aided by the landing of an intact Junkers Ju 88R-1 night fighter in May 1943 in Scotland, by its defecting crew, revealing the latest operational frequencies of the German radars.

=== Serrate/Monica ===
The technique developed was for the RAF night fighter to fly slowly off the bomber stream, mimicking the characteristics of a heavy bomber, until the rearward-facing Serrate (Monica) detector picked up the emissions from a Luftwaffe night fighter approaching. The radar operator would then pass directions to the pilot until the German fighter was 6,000 ft (1,800 m) behind, at which point the Beaufighter would execute a swift turn onto the tail of the German night fighter, pick up the enemy aircraft on his forward radar and attack. Serrate was also subsequently fitted to de Havilland Mosquito night fighters.

No. 141 Squadron transferred to 100 Group Bomber Command in late 1943 and during the Battle of Berlin on the night of 16/17 December, a Mosquito flown by Squadron Leader F. F. Lambert and Flying Officer K. Dear made Bomber Command's first successful Serrate-guided operational sortie when they damaged a Bf 110 with cannon fire. The Serrate night fighter offensive preceded far greater and wide-ranging support operations by the specialist 100 Group during 1944–1945.

== See also ==
- List of World War II electronic warfare equipment
