= IFF Mark II =

Aircraft identification system

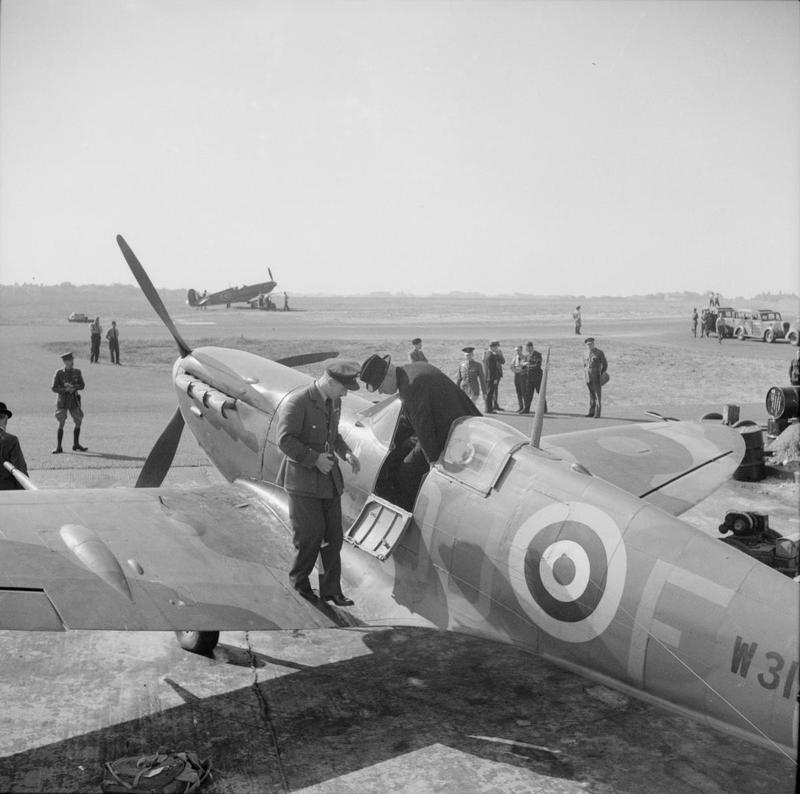
The IFF Mark II antenna on this Spitfire can just be made out, stretching across the rear fuselage from the roundel to the tip of the horizontal stabiliser.

IFF Mark II was the first operational identification friend or foe system. It was developed by the Royal Air Force just before the start of World War II. After a short run of prototype Mark Is, used experimentally in 1939, the Mark II began widespread deployment at the end of the Battle of Britain in late 1940. It remained in use until 1943, when it began to be replaced by the standardised IFF Mark III, which was used by all Allied aircraft until long after the war ended.

The Mark I was a simple system that amplified the signals of the British Chain Home radar systems, causing the aircraft's "blip" to extend on the radar display, identifying the aircraft as friendly. Mark I had the problem that the gain had to be adjusted in flight to keep it working; in the field, it was correct only half the time. Another problem was that it was sensitive to only one frequency and had to be manually tuned to different radar stations. In 1939, Chain Home was the only radar of interest and operated on a limited set of frequencies but new radars were already entering service and the number of frequencies was beginning to multiply.

Mark II addressed both these problems. An automatic gain control eliminated the need to adjust the gain, making the device much more likely to be working properly when interrogated. To work with many types of radar, a complex system of motorised gears and cams constantly shifted the frequency through three wide bands, scanning each every few seconds. These changes automated the operation of the device and made it truly useful for the first time; previously, operators could not be sure if a blip was an enemy aircraft or a friendly one with a maladjusted IFF. Originally ordered in 1939, installation was delayed during the Battle of Britain and the system became widely used from the end of 1940.

Although the Mark II's selection of frequencies covered the early war period, by 1942 so many radars were in use that a series of sub-versions had been introduced to cover particular combinations of radars. The introduction of new radars based on the cavity magnetron required different frequencies to which the system was not easily adapted. This led to the introduction of the Mark III, which operated on a single frequency that could be used with any radar; it also eliminated the need for the complex gear and cam system. Mark III began entering service in 1943 and quickly replaced the Mark II.

== History ==
=== Early efforts ===
Before Chain Home (CH) systems began deployment, Robert Watt had considered the problem of identifying friendly aircraft on a radar display. He filed initial patents on such systems in 1935 and 1936.

In 1938, researchers at the Bawdsey Manor radar research establishment began working with the first of Watt's concepts. This was a simple "reflector" system consisting of a set of dipole antennas that were tuned to resonate at the frequency of the CH radars. When a pulse from the radar hit them, they would resonate for a short period and cause an additional signal to be received by the station. The antennas were connected to a motorised switch that periodically shorted the antenna out and cancelled the broadcast, causing the signal to turn on and off. On the CH display, this caused the "blip" to periodically lengthen and contract. The system proved highly unreliable; it worked only when the aircraft was at certain locations and flying in certain directions.

It was always suspected that this system would be of little use in practice. When that turned out to be the case, the Royal Air Force (RAF) introduced a different system that consisted of a set of tracking stations using HF/DF radio direction finders. The standard aircraft radios were modified to send out a 1 kHz tone for 14 seconds every minute, allowing the tracking stations ample time to measure the aircraft's bearing. Several such stations were assigned to each sector of the air defence system and sent their measurements to a plotting station at sector headquarters. There they used triangulation to determine the aircraft's location.

Known as "pip-squeak", the system worked but was very labour-intensive, requiring operators at several stations and at plotting boards in sector HQs. More operators were needed to merge the information from the pip-squeak system with that from the radar systems to provide one view of the airspace. It also meant the pilots were constantly interrupted when talking to their ground controllers. A system that worked directly with the radar was desired.

=== Mark I ===
Seeking a system that would be as simple as possible, the Bawdsey researchers began work with a regenerative receiver. The idea behind regeneration is to amplify the radio signal and send it into an LC circuit, or "tank", that resonates at a selected frequency. A small part of the tank's output is sent back into the amplifier's input, causing feedback which greatly amplifies the signal. As long as the input signal's frequency is relatively constant, like Morse code signals, a single vacuum tube can provide significant amplification.

One problem with regeneration is that if the feedback is too strong, the signal will grow to the point where it begins to broadcast back out of the antenna and cause interference on other receivers. In the case of the IFF system, this is precisely what was desired. When the radar signal was received, and the gain was properly adjusted, the signal grew until it turned the system from a receiver to a broadcaster. The signal levels were still small, but the receivers in the radar systems were extremely sensitive and the signal from the transceiver was larger than what would normally be received from the reflection of the original radar pulse alone.

This extra signal would cause the aircraft's blip on the radar screen to suddenly grow to be much larger. Since it might be difficult to distinguish the resulting larger signal from IFF from the return of a larger aircraft or formation without IFF, the circuit was connected to a motorised switch that rapidly disconnected and reconnected the receiver, causing the blip to oscillate on the radar display. A switch on the cockpit control panel allowed the pattern to be controlled; one setting sent back 15 microsecond (μs) pulses, the second setting sent 40 μs pulses and the final setting switched between the two with every received pulse.

There were two major disadvantages of the design. One was that the pilot had to carefully set the feedback control; if it was too low the system would not create an output signal and nothing would be received by the radar station, and if it was too high, the circuit would amplify its own electronic noise and give off random signals known as "squitter" across a wide range of frequencies. This caused significant interference over a large area and was a major problem for radar operators. It was too easy to forget to adjust the gain during flight, especially in single-seat fighters, and it was estimated a usable signal was returned only about 50 per cent of the time.

The other problem was that the CH stations operated on a small but distinct set of frequencies, and the system worked on only a single frequency at a time. An aircraft on a typical mission profile might be visible only to a single CH station, or perhaps two or three over their operational area. To address this, the cockpit panel had a card with the frequencies of local CH stations on it, which the pilot had to tune as they moved about. Pilots often forgot to do this, and if they were lost or off-course, they would not know which frequency to tune to, or the nearest station might not be on the card at all.

The Mark I was used only experimentally. Thirty sets were hand-made at AMES and an order for 1,000 was placed with Ferranti in September 1939.

=== Mark II ===
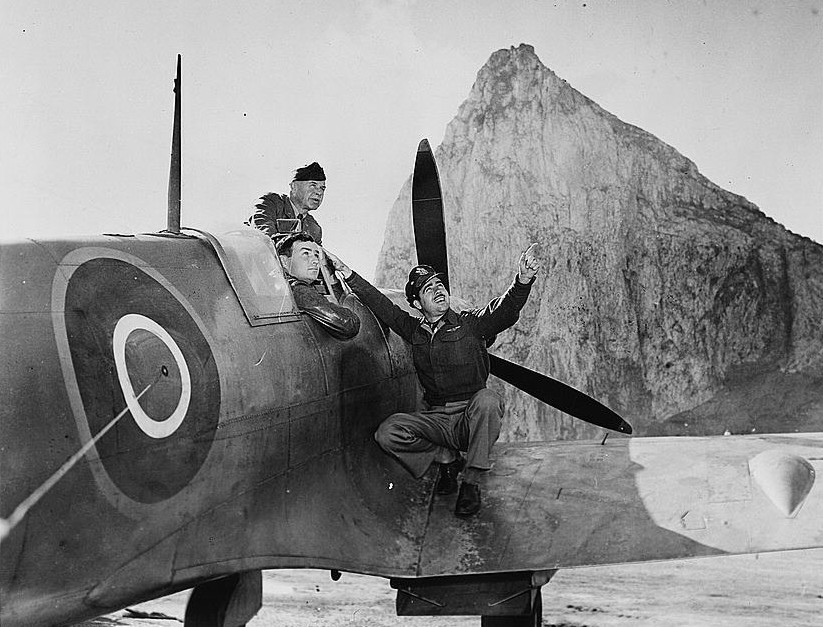
The IFF antenna can be seen on the left of this photo, meeting the fuselage in the RAF roundel. The lengthy antennas, which had to be placed on both sides of the fuselage, slowed the Spitfire by about 2 miles per hour (3.2 km/h). Rock of Gibraltar in background.

Beyond the operational problems with the Mark I, a more serious issue was the growing number of new radar systems being deployed. Even as the Mark I was being tested, the RAF, Royal Navy and British Army were introducing new systems, spanning a wide range of frequencies from the RAF's 200 MHz systems used on night fighters and Chain Home Low to the Army's 75 MHz gun-laying radars and on to the CH at 20 to 30 MHz. Attempting to manually tune among these would be impractical and impossible if the aircraft were visible to more than one radar, which was increasingly the case.

A solution was already under development in early 1939, similar to the Mark I but employing tuned circuits sensitive to many radar sets. It used a "complicated system of cams and cogs and Geneva mechanisms" to switch among the bands by connecting to oscillators covering a band and then used a motorised tuning capacitor to sweep through the frequency range within that band. (Note: A Geneva drive uses a cam and a follower to convert continuous rotary motion to periodic.) To ensure the signal was the right strength and did not cause squitter, an automatic gain control was added. These changes eliminated the need for tuning or gain adjustments in flight, greatly improving the chance it would respond correctly to a radar. Only periodic adjustments on the ground were needed to keep it working properly.

An order for 1,000 sets was sent to Ferranti in October 1939 and they had completed the first 100 sets by November. The rapid expansion of the RAF precluded a significant proportion of its force being equipped by the time of the Battle of Britain in mid-1940. In any case, the action took place mostly over southern England, where IFF would not be very useful as the CH stations were positioned along the coast and could see the fighters only if they were out over the English Channel. There was no pressing need to install the systems and pip-squeak continued in use during the battle.

The lack of IFF led to problems including friendly fire; the Battle of Barking Creek in September 1939 would not have occurred if IFF had been installed. It also meant that enemy aircraft could not be identified if they were close to known RAF aircraft. In July 1940, the Germans began to take advantage of this by inserting their bombers into formations of RAF bombers returning from night missions over Europe. To the ground operators these appeared to be more RAF aircraft and once they crossed the coast there was no way to track them. Even if one of the rare Mark I sets was available, the unreliability of their signals made it difficult for controllers to trust it.

As the Battle of Britain ended, Mark II was rapidly installed in RAF aircraft. Its installation on the Supermarine Spitfire required two wire antennas on the tail that slowed the top speed by 2 miles per hour (3.2 km/h) and added 40 pounds (18 kg) of weight. Pip-squeak was still used for areas over land where CH did not cover, as well as an emergency guidance system. Mark II also found a use on Royal Navy ships, where it was produced as the Type 252 so that ships could identify each other by radar.

A Mark II set was taken to the US as part of the Tizard Mission in November 1940. US researchers were already working on their own IFF system of some complexity. They realised the importance of using a common IFF system and in early 1941 they decided to install Mark II in their own aircraft. Production was taken up by Philco with an order for 18,000 sets as the SCR-535 in July 1942. The system was never entirely reliable.

=== Mark III ===
The profusion of radars that led to the Mark II continued and by 1942 there were almost a dozen sub-types of the Mark II covering sets of frequencies. Some, like the IIN, were tuned to the radars commonly used by the Navy, while others, like the IIG, to those used by ground radars in the Army and Air Force. No one unit could respond to them all. To add to the problem, the cavity magnetron had matured and a new generation of radars operating in the microwave region was about to enter service, using frequencies on which the IFF receivers could not operate.

In 1940, English engineer Freddie Williams had considered this problem and suggested that all IFF operations move to a single frequency. A superregenerative receiver was used. Instead of responding on the radar's frequency and thus mixing with their signal in the receiver, a separate unit would transmit "interrogation" pulses in synchronicity with the radar's pulses, and the received signals would be amplified independently and then mixed with the radar's signals on the display. This greatly simplified the airborne equipment because it operated on one frequency, eliminating the complex multi-band system. The only disadvantage was that a second transmitter and receiver was needed at radar stations.

Production of the IFF Mark III began at Ferranti and was quickly taken up in the US by Hazeltine. It remained the Allies' primary IFF system for the rest of the war; the 176 MHz common frequency was used for many years after.

== Versions ==
From Shayler.

- Mark I – prototype version that worked with CH radars
- Mark II – automatic scanning of three bands covering CH, GL and Navy Type 79 radar
- Mark IIG – "G"round version with bands covering common ground-based radars like CH, CHL, GL, and AMES Type 7
- Mark IIN – "N"aval version with bands covering various Royal Navy radars like Type 286
- ABE (SCR-535 and SCR-535/A) – US version covering US Army radars like SCR-268, SCR-270, SCR-271 and SCR-516
- ABK – US version covering US Navy radars as well as common ground radars
