= Cap d'Antifer Lighthouse =

Lighthouse in Seine-Maritime, France

Cap d Antifer Lighthouse
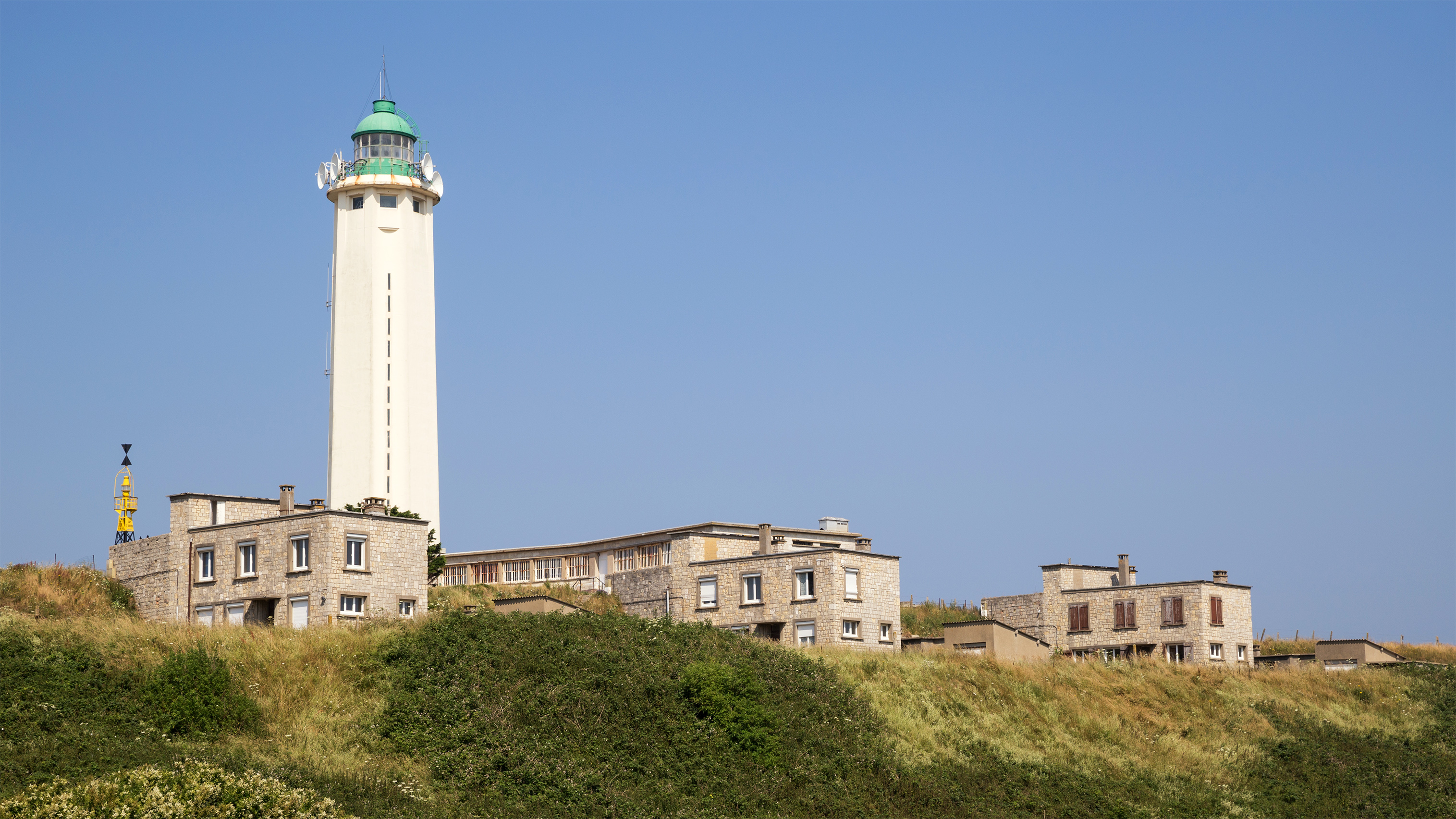
- Location: La Poterie-Cap-d'Antifer, France
- Coordinates: 49.6835°N 0.1654°E

Tower
- Height: 38 metres (125 ft)
- Heritage: monument historique inscrit

Light
- First lit: 1955
- Focal height: 128 metres (420 ft)
- Lens: hyperradiant Fresnel lens
- Range: 29 nautical miles (54 km; 33 mi)
- Characteristic: Fl W 20s

The Cap d'Antifer Lighthouse (French: Phare d'Antifer) is an active aid to navigation on the headland of the same name which forms part of the French Côte d'Albâtre (Alabaster coast) of the English Channel, in Seine-Maritime, Normandy. Located on the edge of the cliffs within the commune of La Poterie-Cap-d'Antifer, it was built to guide shipping into the Port of Le Havre.

The current lighthouse was commissioned in 1955 and is the second to be built at the site after the original 19th century lighthouse was destroyed during World War II.

== History ==
The need for a lighthouse on the Cap d’Antifer, was identified in 1889, primarily to aid navigation to the entrance Le Havre. It was suggested that it should have a powerful light source, similar to that used for other landfall lighthouses, as the existing light at Fécamp was inadequate in this respect.

In 1890, the Commission des Phares made the decision to construct the lighthouse, with a tower height of 26m, and a focal plane of 120m, and it was completed in 1894.

=== Optic ===
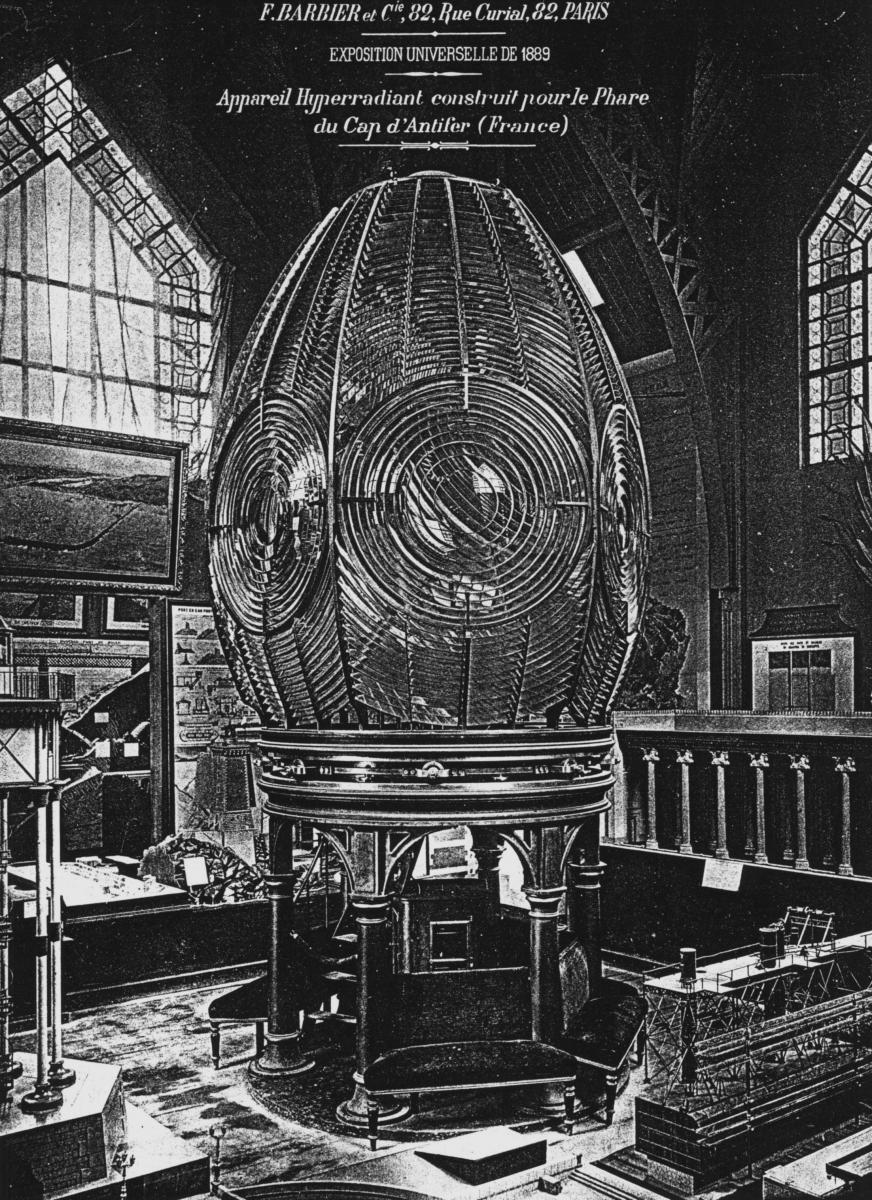
The hyper-radial lens on display at the Exposition Universelle (1889)

The lantern room was designed to accommodate a hyper-radial optic, the largest type of Fresnel lens available. Made up of six bullseye panels, and manufactured by F. Barbier, the optic was displayed at the Exposition Universelle of 1889 a world's fair held in Paris before being installed in the tower, the only hyper-radial lens to be used in a French lighthouse. To enable the optic to turn freely it was mounted upon a circular bath of mercury, known as a mercury float, providing an almost frictionless bearing. The rotation produced a white flash every 20 seconds, with a range of 31 miles. Originally lit with mineral oil and wick burners, the light source was converted to kerosene in 1905. In 1926, the lighthouse was electrified using diesel generators.

It continued in operation through to the Second World War, until German soldiers demolished the entire lighthouse and the optic as they withdrew at the end of Occupation of France in late summer 1944.

== 1955 lighthouse ==
After the war a temporary pole light was erected, with construction of the current lighthouse beginning in 1949. Completed in 1955, it has a 38 m high octagonal concrete tower with fluted sides, with a focal height of 128m. Rather than building it in the same spot as the old light, the site was moved back 30m away from the eroding cliff edge. A grassy berm was also placed around the site, to protect the keeper's houses from the wind in the clifftop location. In 2002, the lighthouse was declared a monument historique. It is registered under the international Admiralty number A1250 and it has the NGA identifier of 114–8740.

The optic used is smaller than the hyper-radial of the previous lighthouse, being of the second-order with a focal length of 700mm, but from the same company of Barbier, Benard, et Turenne. Mounted within a 2m diameter green lantern room made by Sautter-Harle, and lit by a 650 watt lamp, the light has a nominal range of 29 nautical miles.

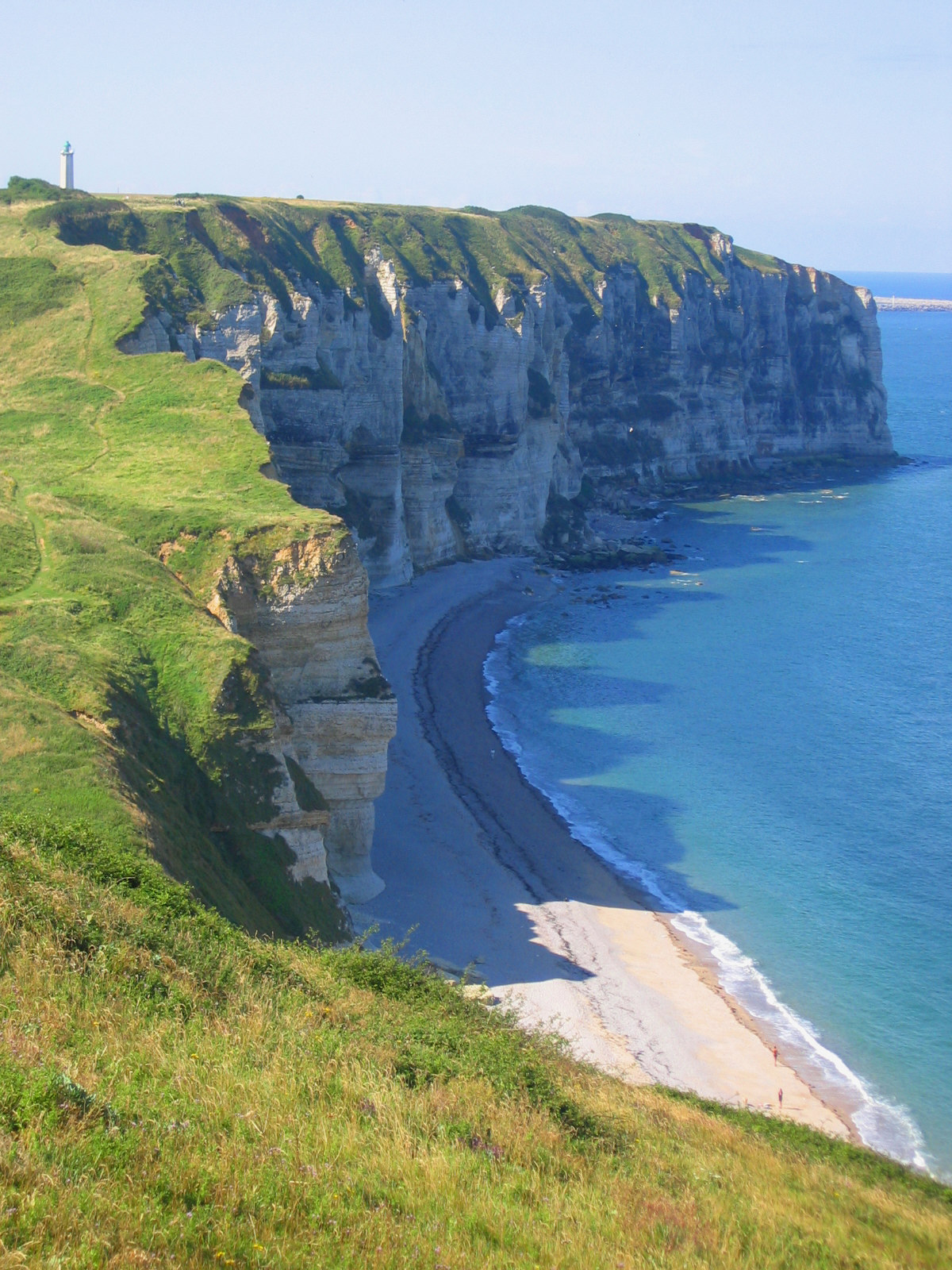
View of cliffs and lighthouse

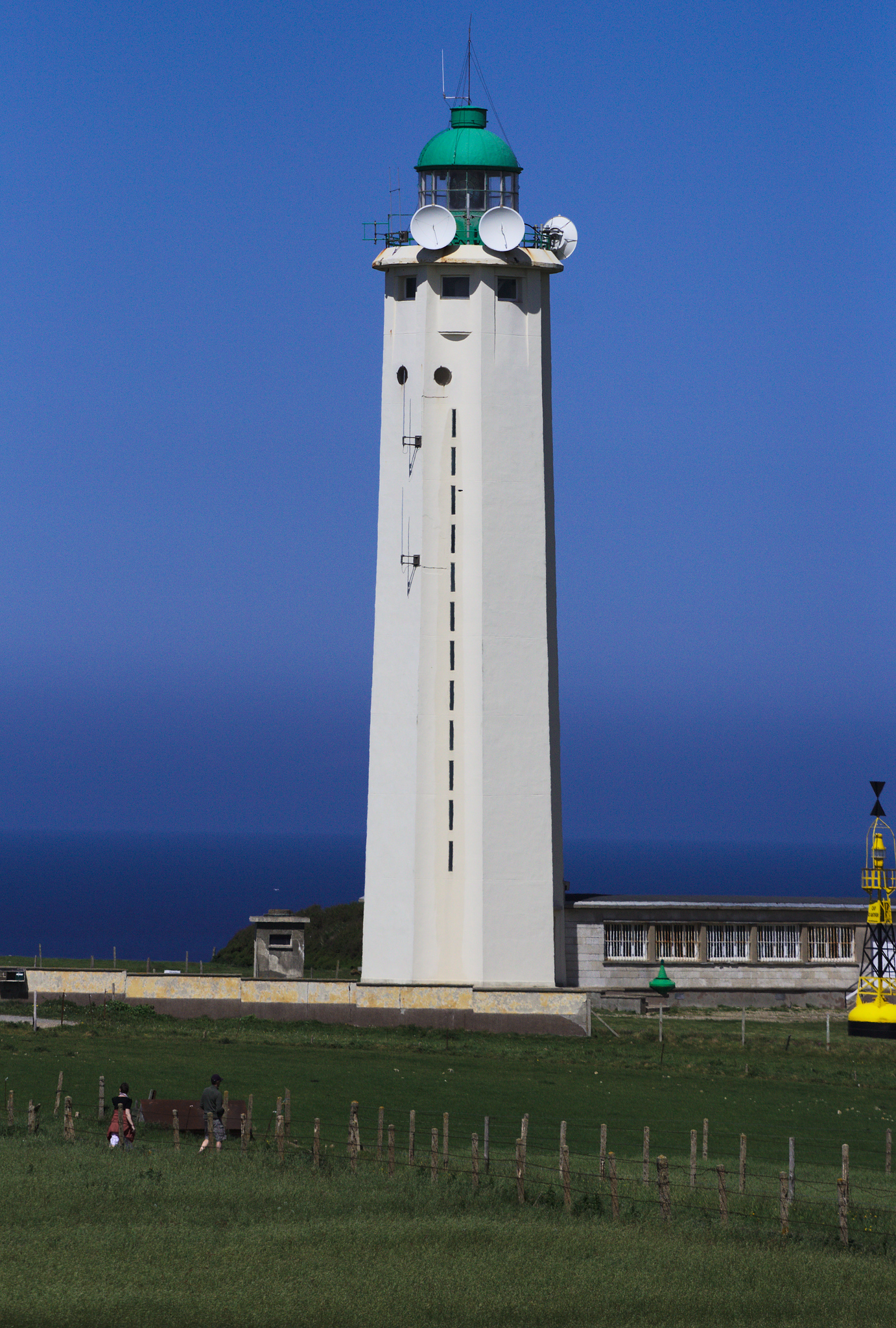
Detail of tower

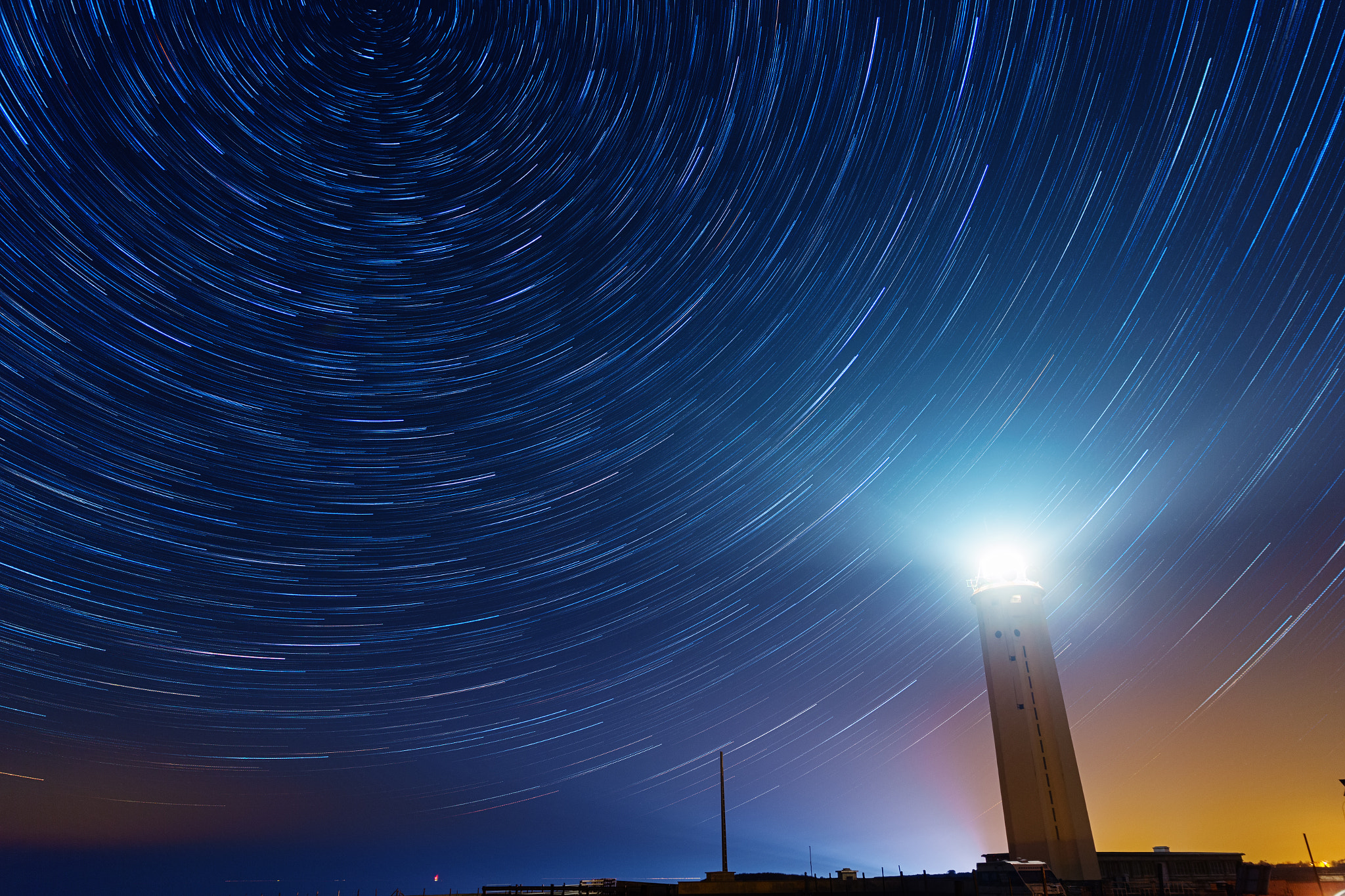
Night view

== See also ==
- List of lighthouses in France
