= Combat identification =

Identification of a unit as friend or foe

Combat identification is the means of military communications by which units distinguish own and allied forces from enemy in combat and reduce the risk of friendly fire. It includes military uniform markings, vehicle markings, etc. One of the common methods is transponder-based identification friend or foe.

== United Kingdom ==
The British military uses tactical recognition flashes on the uniform sleeves. The 1998 Strategic Defence Review and the NATO Defence Capabilities Initiative, initiated at the 1999 Washington summit of NATO, provided the UK Ministry of Defence with the framework for a modern combat identification strategy. In July 2001, the Ministry of Defence approved a policy paper on combat identification and associated action plan.

== United States ==
The United States Armed Forces use various identification devices, such as combat identification panel, Shoulder Sleeve Insignia, etc.

== Ukraine ==
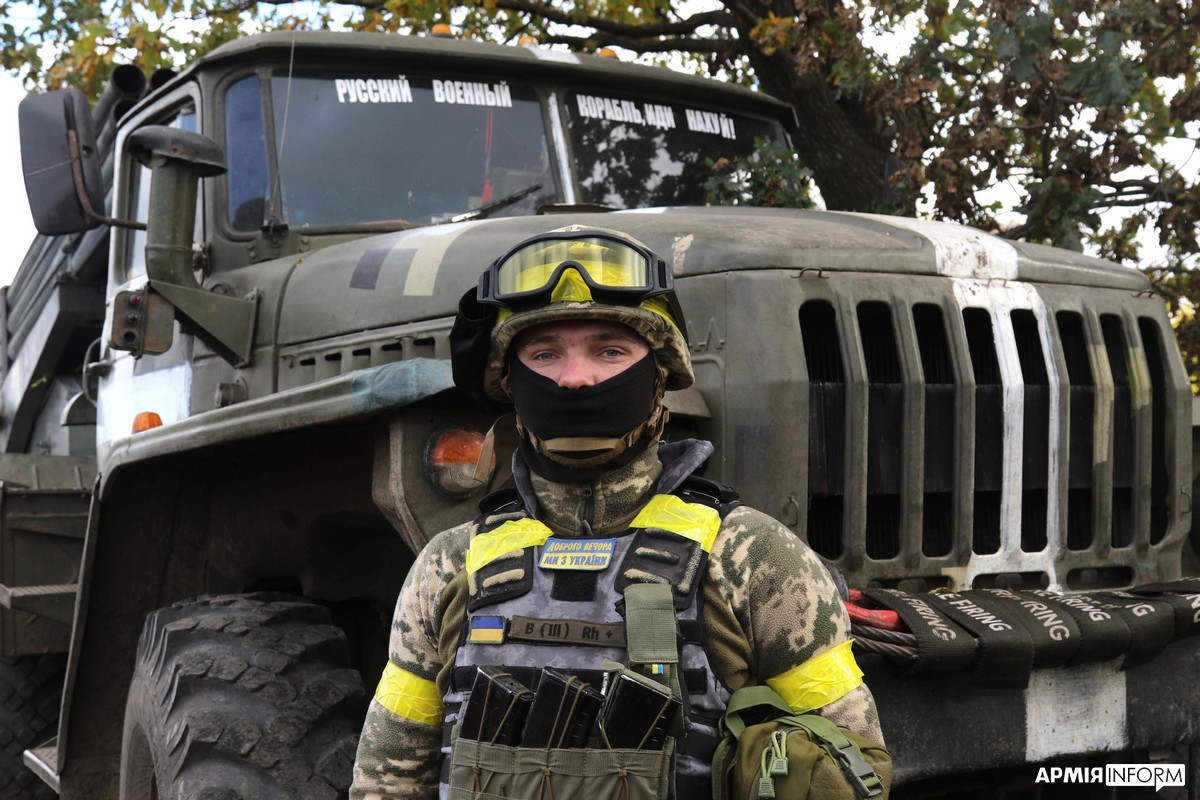
A Ukrainian soldier with yellow armbands and tapes on his vest and helmet

During the Russian invasion of Ukraine, the Ukrainian Ground Forces started to use yellow reflective tape armbands, similar to the yellow reflective belts used in the U.S. Army. Later, they switched the tape color to blue (the other color of the Ukrainian flag) to prevent Russians from infiltrating their ranks. Green has also been seen as a tape color used by the Armed Forces of Ukraine.

Russian forces have traditionally used white cloth armbands for IFF purposes, stemming as far back as the First Chechen War when it was vital to differentiate between federal and Chechen forces due to the similarity of the equipment used by both sides. Red reflective tape was later chosen by Russian forces during the Russian invasion of Ukraine and the Ukrainian Interior Ministry urged citizens to pay special attention to people with red on their clothing and report such people to the police. A stripe pattern based on the St. George's ribbon has also been seen in use with Russian forces.

== See also ==
- Dog tag
- Military identity card
