= Berlin (radar) =

Berlin can refer to several German 9 cm wavelength (3.3 GHz) microwave radars of World War II, developed after the capture of examples of the British cavity magnetron in the H2S radar.

- FuG 224 Berlin A of 1944, a PPI ground mapping radar
- FuG 240 Berlin N1 of 1945, an airborne interception radar for nightfighters
- FuMO 81, a naval development of the FuG 224
- FuMO 83 Berlin I, for U-boats
- FuMO 84 Berlin II, for the type XXI U-boat
