= La Poterie-Cap-d'Antifer =

La Poterie-Cap-d’Antifer
- Commune
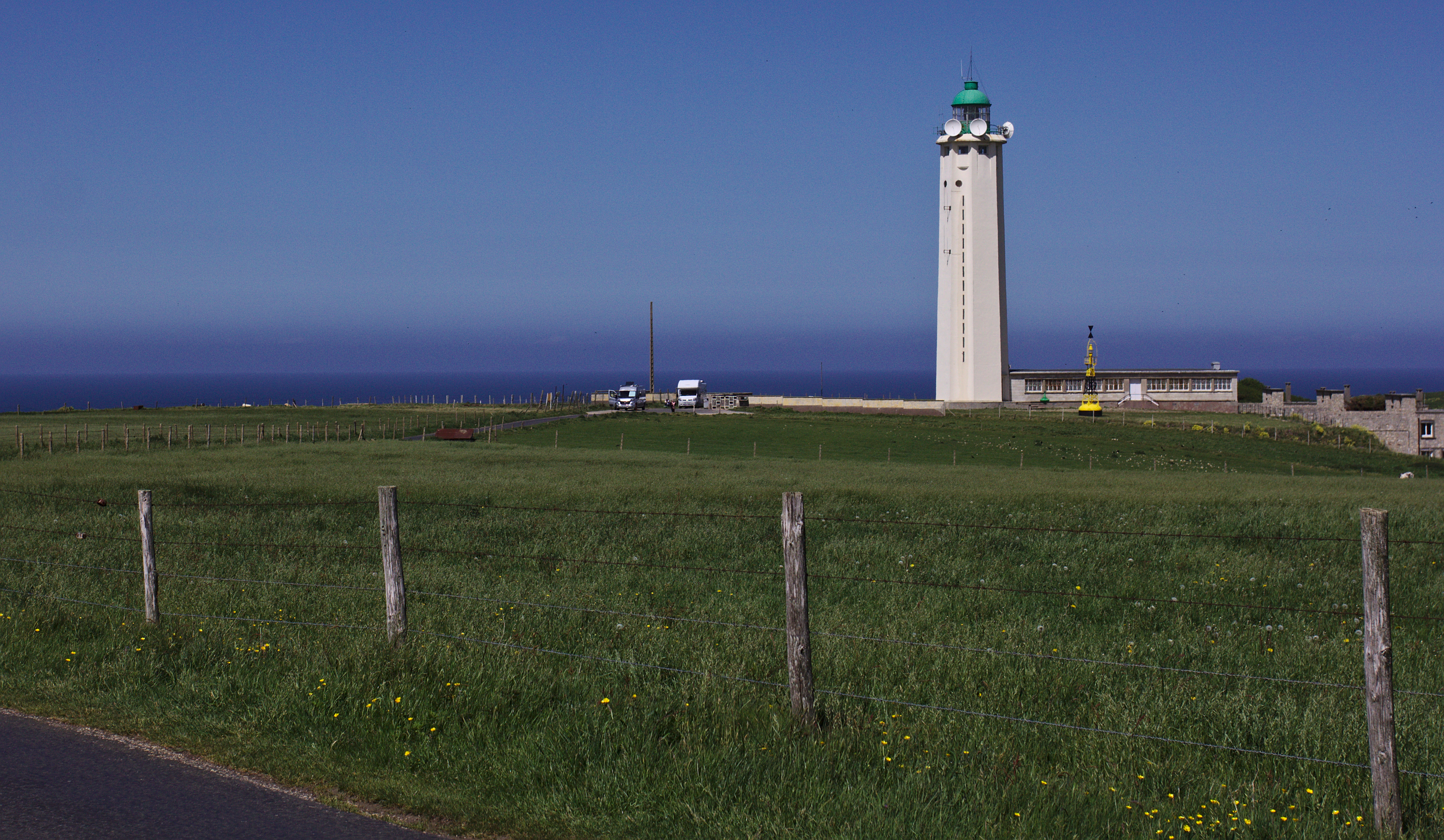
- Cap d'Antifer Lighthouse
- Location of La Poterie-Cap-d’Antifer
- Location within France Location within Normandy
- Coordinates: 49°40′20″N 0°11′21″E
- Country: France
- Region: Normandy
- Department: Seine-Maritime
- Arrondissement: Le Havre
- Canton: Octeville-sur-Mer
- Intercommunality: Le Havre Seine Métropole
- Area^{1}: 5.81 km^{2} (2.24 sq mi)
- Elevation: 105 m (344 ft)
- Highest elevation: 114 m (374 ft)
- Lowest elevation: 0 m (0 ft)
- Population (2023): 454
  - Density: 78.1/km^{2} (202/sq mi)
- Time zone: UTC+01:00 (CET)
  - Summer (DST): UTC+02:00 (CEST)
- INSEE/Postal code: 76508 /76280
- ^{1} French Land Register data, which excludes lakes, ponds, glaciers > 1 km^{2} (0.386 sq mi or 247 acres) and river estuaries.

La Poterie-Cap-d’Antifer is a commune in the Seine-Maritime department in the Normandy region in northern France. It is located within the Seine-Maritime department.

== History ==
During World War II, Operation Biting (also known as the Bruneval Raid) was a successful Combined Operations raid to capture components of a German Würzburg radar set at La Poterie-Cap-d’Antifer and evacuated by the Bruneval beach on 27/28 February 1942. On 6 June 1944, small boats called Harbour Defense Motor Launches (HDML) simulated an invasion fleet headed towards the area as part of Operation Taxable. Today, it is a peaceful place full of tranquility.

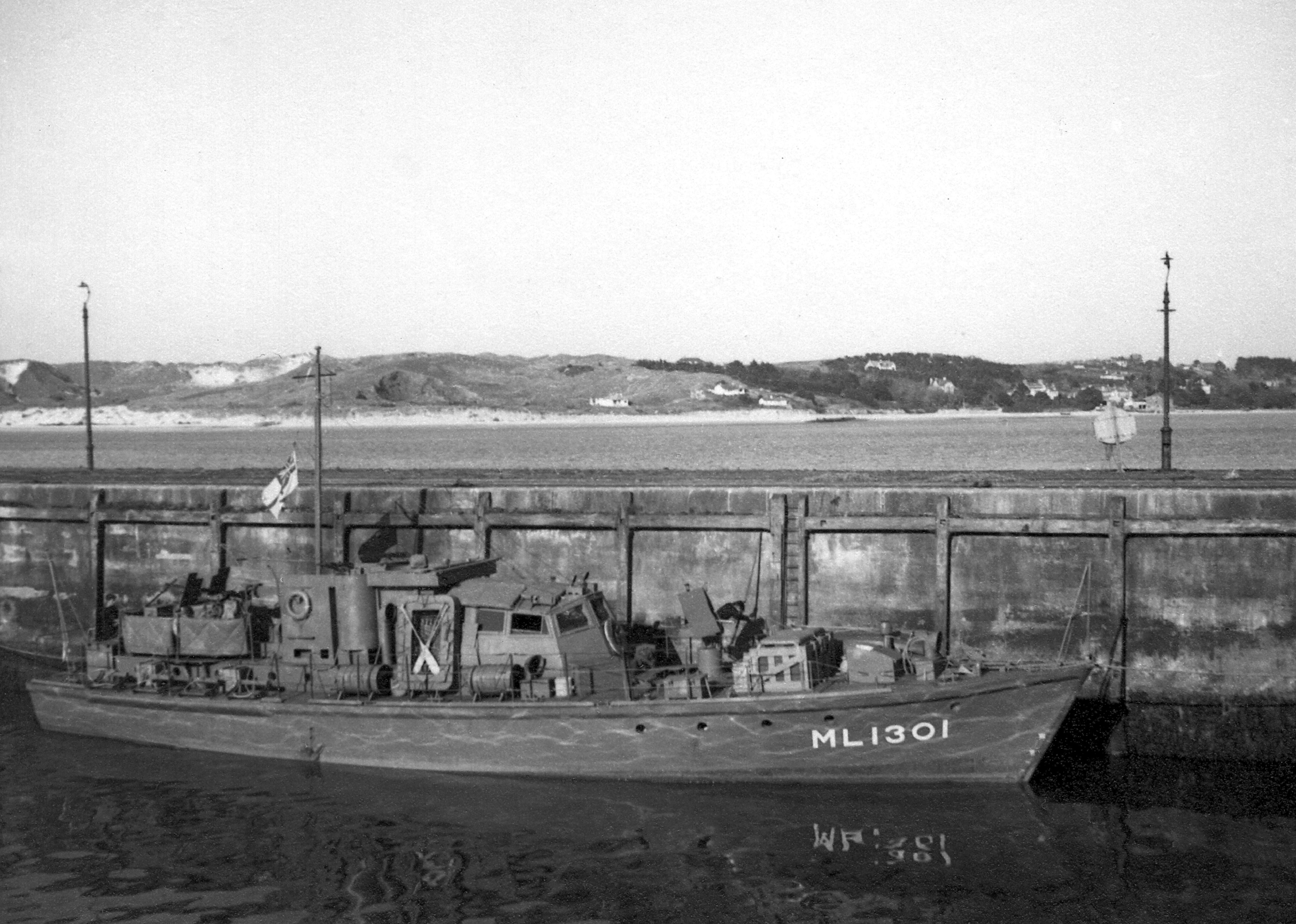
A HDML similar to the ones used for Operation Taxable

== Geography ==
A farming village in the Pays de Caux, some 12 miles (19 km) north of Le Havre, at the junction of the D111 and D950 roads. The commune borders the English Channel and has a beach and some spectacular limestone cliffs. The oil terminal Port du Havre-Antifer lies to the southwest, on territory of the adjacent commune Saint-Jouin-Bruneval.

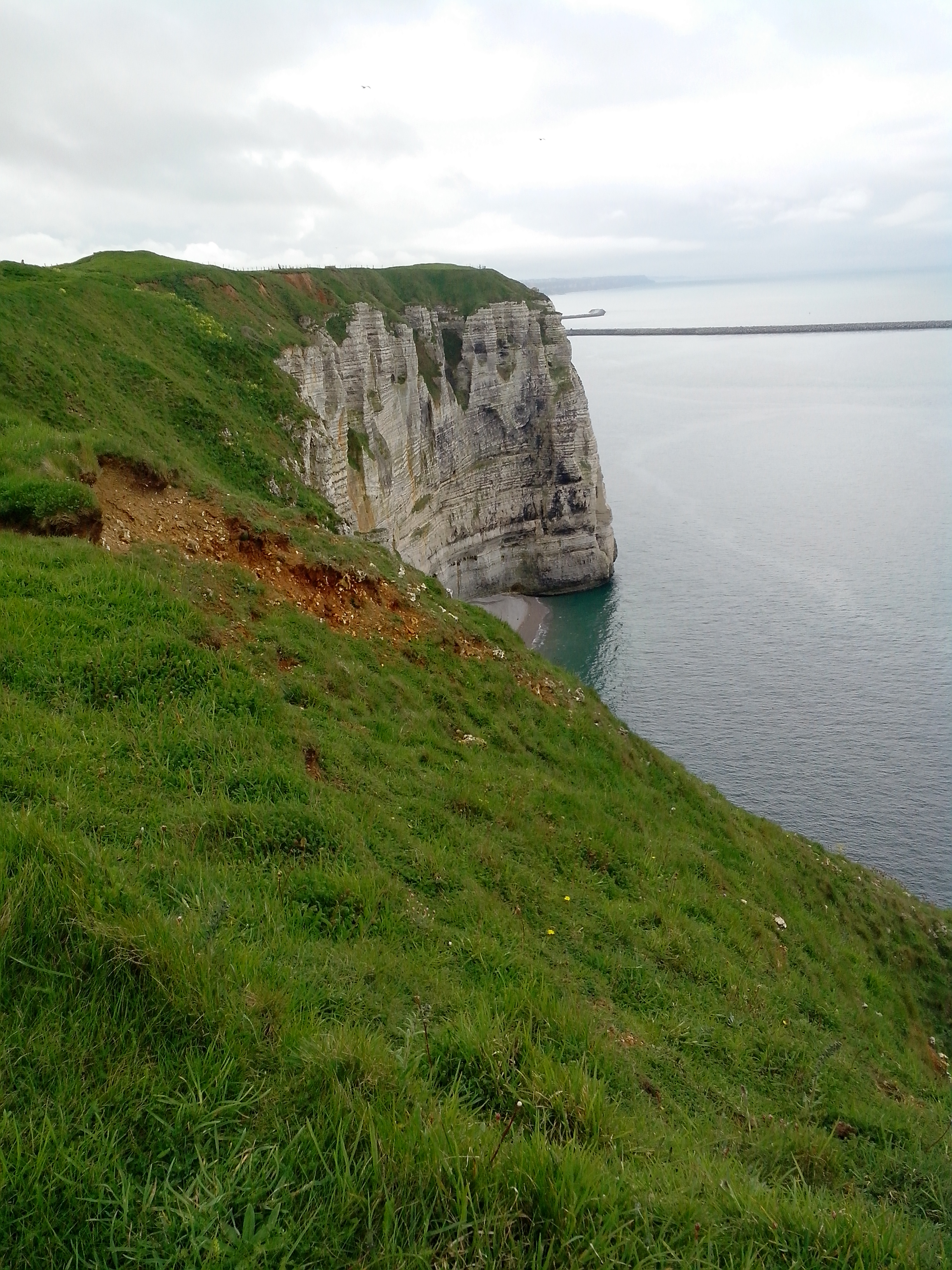
View of the cliffs

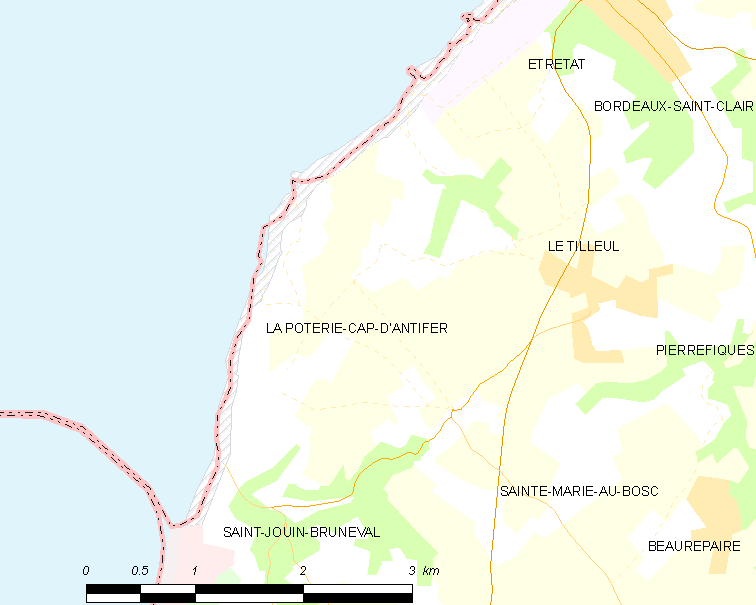
Map showing the oil terminal in the bottom left.

== Population ==
Historical population
| Year | Pop. | ±% p.a. |
|---|---|---|
| 1968 | 269 | — |
| 1975 | 273 | +0.21% |
| 1982 | 314 | +2.02% |
| 1990 | 304 | −0.40% |
| 1999 | 316 | +0.43% |
| 2007 | 364 | +1.78% |
| 2012 | 445 | +4.10% |
| 2017 | 453 | +0.36% |
| 2023 | 454 | +0.04% |
Source: INSEE

== Places of interest ==
- The church of St. Martin, dating from the seventeenth century.
- The Cap d'Antifer Lighthouse.
- Aforementioned farming village.

== See also ==
- Communes of the Seine-Maritime department
- Shipping Forecast, Antifer in the French system refers to Wight in the British system.
