= FuG 224 Berlin A =

Type of aircraft radar

FuG 224 Berlin A was a German airborne radar of World War II. It used rotating antennae and a PPI (Plan Position Indicator) display to allow its use for ground mapping.

Although only a handful of sets were constructed, they saw service on the Fw 200 Condor.

== Description ==
=== Influence of the British cavity magnetron ===
FuG 224 Berlin A, and the contemporary FuG 240 Berlin N1 or Nachtjagd air interception radar, both made use of captured examples of the British cavity magnetron in the H2S radar. A H2S-equipped Short Stirling bomber had crashed near Rotterdam on the night of 2 February 1943. This led to H2S being given the German codename Rotterdam Gerät. Telefunken were instructed to examine the wreckage and build six replicas of it. This study also led to the development of the Naxos radar detector against it.

Telefunken studied the design of the cavity magnetron and found it superior to the German split-anode magnetrons, particularly for its high power, high frequency performance. Magnetrons based on this captured 9 cm wavelength design, the British CV64, were produced, the German LMS10 operating with a power of 10 kW. Radar using them followed, but not quickly, the FuG 224 not appearing until early 1944. Few sets were built, around 50.

One difference with the German magnetron was the source of the magnetic field. British magnetrons used high quality permanent magnets. These were so difficult to obtain in Germany that they were recovered from crashed Allied aircraft. The main German magnetron used an electromagnet instead.

=== Antenna ===
The antenna of the FuG 224 was unusual, a four element Dielektrische Strahler or polyrod (British) array. Capture of the magnetron had allowed the development of the Naxos radar detector as a countermeasure to it. This had been the first equipment to use a polyrod antenna. Each rod is a tapering end-fed rod made of a polystyrene dielectric. The four array elements were 3 λ long (27 cm) apiece, and spaced 1.5 λ (13.5 cm) apart. Using this array, rather than a parabolic dish, gave an extremely compact antenna, with only a shallow protrusion, which was well-suited for aircraft carriage, particularly when needed to rotate. The array could rotate at the high speed of 400 rpm, fast enough that the PPI display did not require the usual long persistence phosphor.

=== Display deflection ===
Magnetic deflection was used to produce the PPI display. The first design used two fixed sets of deflection yokes, at right angles to each other, and varying the drive signal to both of them by means of a goniometer. Later designs used the more conventional approach, where a single deflection yoke was physically rotated, in synchronism with the antenna's rotation.

The rotating deflection yoke was an advantage for naval use, where multiple displays were provided for the same radar set. By using the established technology of synchros (Note: Also known as Selsyn (US) or Drehfeldgeber (German)) and resolvers, stable slaved displays could be provided.

== Naval developments ==
=== FuMO 81 ===
FuMO 81 was a development of Berlin A for large surface warships. It was installed on the Tirpitz and Prinz Eugen.

=== FuMO 83 ===
FuMO 83 Berlin I U1

=== FuMO 84 ===
FuMO 84 Berlin II was a naval development of the FuG 224, intended for the type XXI U-boats.
