= D-Day naval deceptions =

1944 military operations

Taxable, Glimmer and Big Drum
- Part of Operation Bodyguard
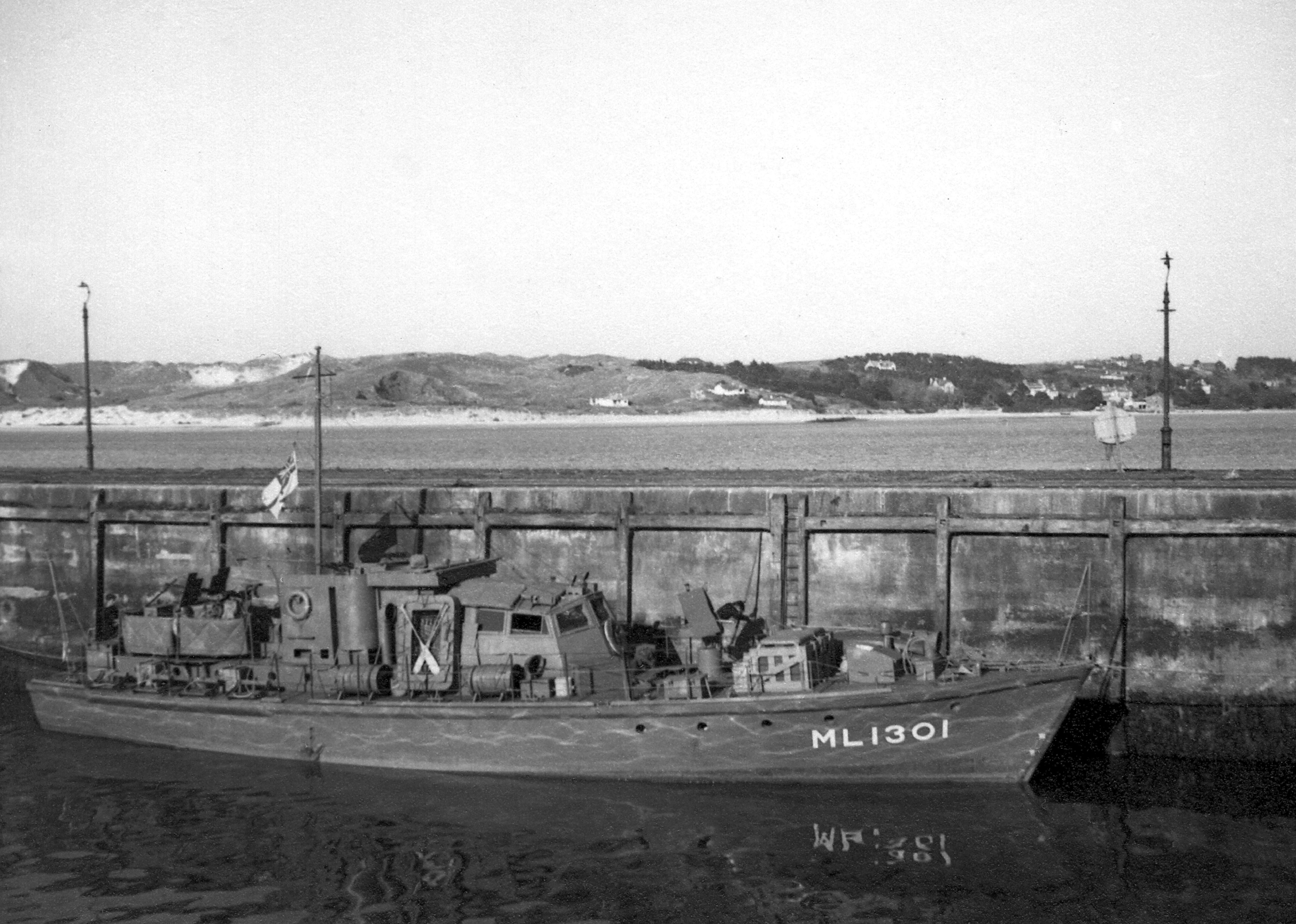
- A Harbour Defence Motor Launch, similar to those used during the operations
- Operational scope: Tactical deception
- Location: English Channel
- Planned: 1944
- Planned by: London Controlling Section, Ops (B)
- Target: Cap d'Antifer, Pas-de-Calais, Normandy
- Date: 5–6 June 1944
- Executed by: No. 617 "Dam Busters" Squadron; No. 218 "Gold Coast" Squadron; Royal Naval Reserve
- Outcome: Limited success in deceiving the Axis as to Allied intentions

Operations Taxable, Glimmer and Big Drum were tactical military deceptions conducted on 6 June 1944 in support of the Allied landings in Normandy. The operations formed the naval component of Operation Bodyguard, a wider series of tactical and strategic deceptions surrounding the Battle of Normandy.

Small boats, along with aircraft from RAF Bomber Command, simulated invasion fleets approaching Cap d'Antifer, Pas-de-Calais and Normandy. Glimmer and Taxable played on the German belief, amplified by Allied deception efforts over the preceding months, that the main invasion force would land in the Calais region. Big Drum was positioned on the western flank of the real invasion force to try to confuse German forces about the scale of the landings. These operations complemented Operation Titanic, which was intended to confuse the Germans about the D-Day airborne forces.

It is unclear whether the operations were successful, due to the complexity of their execution, poor weather, and lack of response from German forces. It is possible that they contributed to the overall confusion of D-Day as part of the wider Bodyguard plan.

== Background ==
Glimmer, Taxable and Big Drum were World War II deception operations. They were conducted as part of Operation Bodyguard, a broad strategic military deception intended to support the Allied invasion of German-occupied France in June 1944. Bodyguard was designed to confuse the Axis high command as to Allied intentions during the lead-up to the invasion. The London Controlling Section (LCS) had spent some time convincing German commanders that the fictional First United States Army Group (FUSAG) represented the bulk of the Allied invasion force. FUSAG's existence was fabricated through Operation Fortitude South.

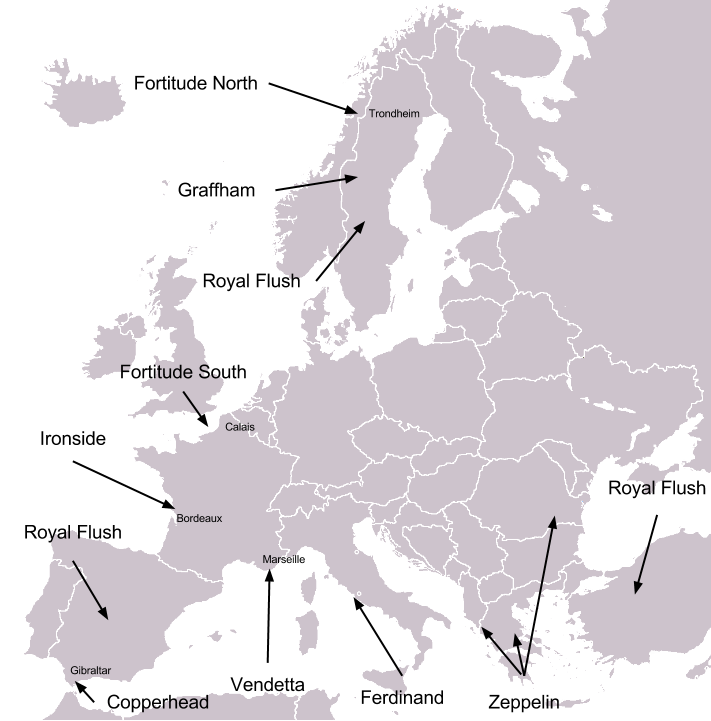
The D-Day naval deceptions made up one part of Operation Bodyguard.

The Allied story for FUSAG was that the army group, based in south-east England, would invade the Pas-de-Calais region several weeks after a smaller diversionary landing in Normandy. In reality, the main invasion force would land in Normandy on D-Day. As D-Day approached, the LCS moved on to planning tactical deceptions to help cover the progress of the real invasion forces. As well as naval operations, the LCS also planned operations involving paratroopers and ground deceptions. The latter would come into effect once landings were made but the former (involving naval, air and special forces units) were used to cover the approach of the true invasion fleet.

In preparation for the coming landings, Allied scientists had worked on techniques for obscuring the size and disposition of an invasion force. The German defences relied on the Seetakt radar system. Scientists from the Telecommunications Research Establishment discovered that the resolution of the Seetakt was about 520 yards (480 m). To deceive the radar system they proposed dropping clouds of aluminium foil (chaff, then code-named Window) at two mile intervals. The clouds would appear as a continuous blip, similar to one created by an approaching fleet, on German screens. The Allies also repurposed radio equipment, code named Moonshine, to jam the Seetakt signal. Allied command decided that, rather than mask the approaching fleet, these measures would serve to alert German defences. So it was decided to combine these techniques with small groups of boats to simulate an entire invasion fleet aimed at the Calais region.

Allied planners proposed that small boats, towing large radar reflecting balloons (code named Filbert) and carrying both Moonshine jamming and standard wireless equipment (for transmitting fake traffic), would advance toward the French coast under a cloud of Window. The chaff and other countermeasures would hide the small size of the naval force while wireless traffic would play on the FUSAG story to mislead the Germans into expecting a major landing. A third deceptive force, Operation Big Drum, would use radar countermeasures on the western flank of the true invasion fleet. This operation was intended to lend confusion as to the extent of the landings in Normandy.

== Glimmer and Taxable ==
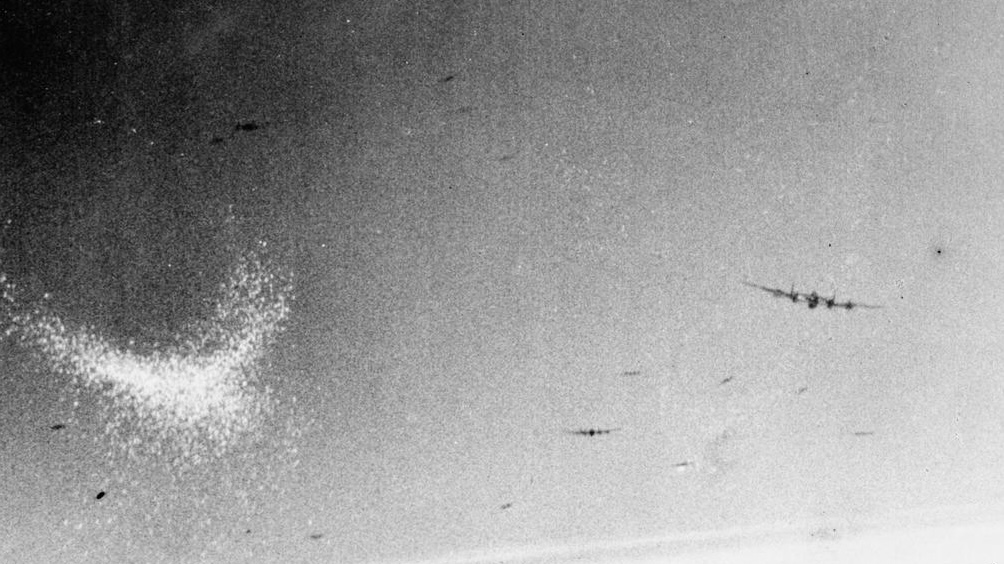
Chaff being dropped from a Lancaster bomber, similar to the method used during Taxable and Glimmer

Glimmer and Taxable were very similar operations. They were executed in the early hours of 6 June 1944 while the invasion fleet was approaching Normandy. Taxable simulated an invasion force approaching Cap d'Antifer (about 80 km from the actual D-Day landings) and Glimmer spoofed an invasion at Pas-de-Calais (far from Normandy). By dropping chaff in progressive patterns, Royal Air Force (RAF) bombers for both operations were able to create the illusion of a large fleet on coastal radar screens. Beneath the chaff, small boats towed radar reflector balloons and simulated the radio traffic expected of a large fleet. Once German forces were drawn to the coast, it was planned that the RAF would attempt to contain them in this region, and away from the actual invasion site, by bombing bridges and roads. The operations required precise flying in elongated circuits with replacement aircraft having to merge in seamlessly to avoid tell-tale gaps. The bombers were staged at 2-mile (3.2 km) intervals parallel to the French coast. Once in position they would spend two and a half minutes flying toward the coast, dropping chaff at fifteen-second intervals. Then the aircraft would turn and head away from the coast for two minutes and ten seconds. By repeating this circuit, the wide cloud of chaff edged toward the coast just like a real sea-borne fleet. The aircraft had to be modified by cutting a hole in the nose to allow the large quantities of chaff to be dropped.

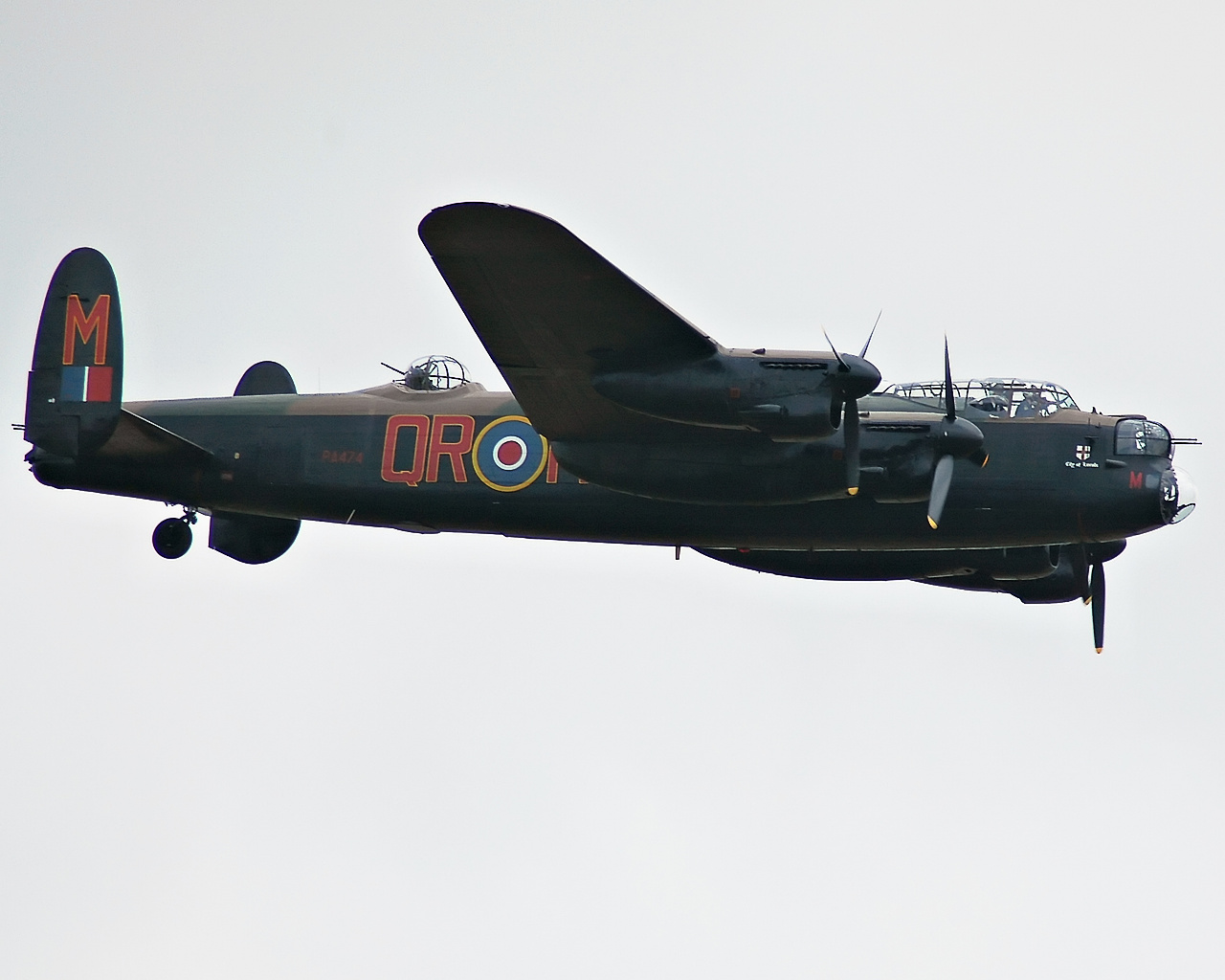
Operation Taxable was carried out by No. 617 "Dam Busters" Squadron flying Lancaster Bombers.

The larger of the two operations, Taxable, was carried out by 18 small boats, a mix of Harbour Defence Motor Launches (HDML) and RAF Pinnaces, designated Special Task Force A. Chaff was dropped by Lancaster bombers from the No. 617 "Dam Busters" Squadron. Each aircraft carried an expanded crew of up to 14. The squadron began training for the operation on 7 May, but were not aware of their final target. Task Force A left port in the evening of 5 June, but struggled in bad seas which affected their equipment and ability to converge at their meeting point. By 00:37 on 6 June the lead boats were on schedule and had reached the muster point. Between 02:00 and 04:00 the ships operated radar and radio equipment as they headed toward a point 7 miles (11 km) offshore. From there the task force simulated a landing attempt; by running fast to within 2 miles (3.2 km) of the beach before returning to the 7-mile marker under cover of smoke. During this time only a small German response was observed including searchlights and intermittent gunfire. Shortly after 05:00 the operation ended and the task force laid mines before heading toward Newhaven, reaching port by midday.

The air operations for Glimmer were conducted by No. 218 "Gold Coast" Squadron under Wing Commander R. M. Fenwick-Wilson. The squadron flew six Short Stirling bombers on the operation, with two additional airborne reserve aircraft. Each aircraft carried two pilots who rotated flying duties. The naval contingent, Special Task Force B under the command of Lieutenant Commander W. M. Rankin, consisted of 12 HDMLs equipped with jamming gear, radios and radar-reflecting balloons. The task force began jamming operations at approximately 01:00 followed by radio chatter around an hour later.

Glimmer elicited more response from German forces than Taxable including reconnaissance planes sent to investigate the "fleet". After completing their assignment (which, unlike Taxable, did not include laying mines) the ships returned to port, reaching their berths by 13:00 on D-Day.

== Big Drum ==
Big Drum was similar to the other D-Day naval deceptions, but without an airborne component. Task Force C consisted of four HDMLs, whose job was to operate as a distraction on the western flank of the invasion. The plan originally called for the task force, which was attached to Force U (the westernmost convoy of the invasion fleet), to operate radar jamming equipment as it approached the French coast, holding 2 miles (3.2 km) off shore until first light. After the Germans failed to respond, the ships moved to within 1.5 miles (2.4 km) of the coast. No response, either in the air or on the shore, was observed, and the convoy returned safely to Newhaven.

== Impact ==
Taxable, Glimmer and Big Drum were complicated in execution, requiring coordination of air and naval forces. Launched in poor weather conditions, Taxable did not appear to have the desired effect and failed to elicit any significant response from the Germans. The reaction to Glimmer was more encouraging. The attacks on the bomber squadrons indicated, at least to the satisfaction of RAF Bomber Command, that the Germans believed a genuine threat existed. There is no evidence that Big Drum elicited any specific response from the shore. According to historian Mary Barbier, the adverse conditions and complexity of the operations contributed to the limited enemy response.

From intelligence intercepts it appears that German forces in the Pas de Calais region reported an invasion fleet. In addition, there are reports of the decoys being fired on by shore batteries in that area. In an 11 June report on the operations, Lieutenant Commander Ian Cox (who was in charge of deception units) indicated that German forces had been convinced by the fake radio traffic. Intercepted dispatches from Hiroshi Ōshima, the Japanese ambassador to Germany, made reference to the naval deceptions. An 8 June dispatch referred to the Calais region and stated "an enemy squadron that had been operating there has now withdrawn".

Although disappointed not to have seen any action during the night of D-Day, and still unsure of their actual impact, the bomber crews felt proud of the operations. Squadron Leader Les Munro of No. 617 Squadron wrote, "I have always considered the operation in one sense to be the most important the squadron carried out in my time – not because [of] bad weather, nor because of any threat of enemy action and not measured by any visible results, but because of the very exacting requirements to which we had to fly and navigate".
