= Bomber stream =

Military tactic in World War II

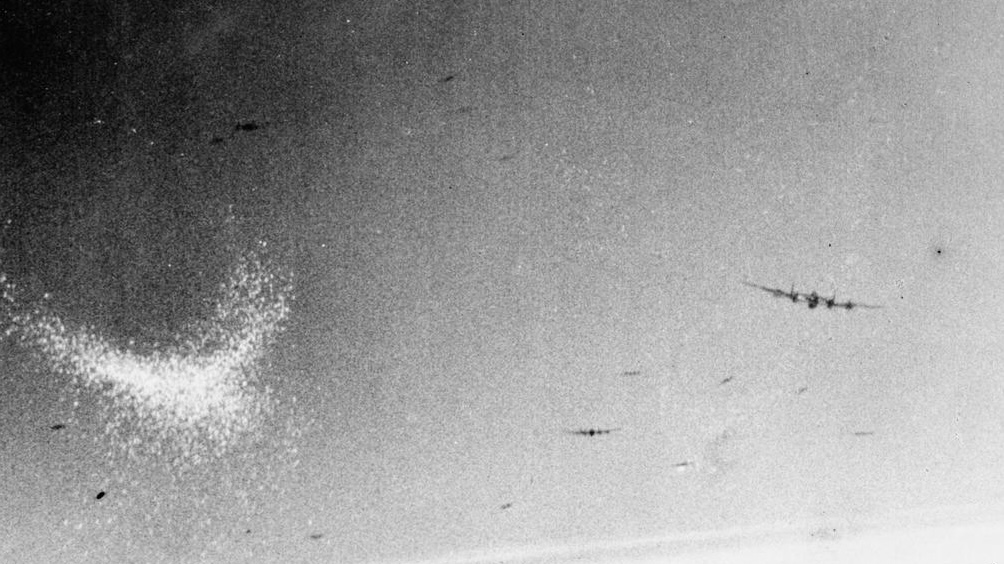
A Lancaster within the bomber stream dropping chaff — the crescent-shaped white cloud on the left of the picture

The bomber stream was a saturation attack tactic developed by the Royal Air Force (RAF) Bomber Command to overwhelm the nighttime German aerial defences of the Kammhuber Line during World War II.

The Kammhuber Line consisted of three layers of zones of about 32 km (17 nmi) long (north–south) and 20 km (11 nmi) wide (east–west). In each zone there were two German night fighter aircraft receiving ground-directed guidance from the Himmelbett controller within their zone. While the Himmelbett control center could only handle two fighters, this was adequate for dealing with the RAF Bomber Command tactic of sending its night bombers individually, with each bomber plotting its own route to the target, to avoid flak concentrations.

A map of part of the Kammhuber Line showing the 'belt' and nightfighter 'boxes' through which the bomber stream flew

At the urging of British scientific military strategist R. V. Jones, Bomber Command reorganized their attacks into streams carefully positioned to fly right down the middle of a cell. The introduction of the GEE navigation system allowed the RAF bombers to fly a long, tight, formation in the dark—a 'stream of bombers' flying a common route at the same speed to and from the target, each aircraft being allotted a height band and a time slot in a bomber stream to minimize the risk of formation collision.

In one of the first applications of statistical operational research, the RAF estimated the number of bombers likely to be lost to enemy night fighters and flak, and how many would be lost through collisions. Minimizing the former demanded a densely packed stream, as the controllers of a night fighter flying a defensive 'box' could only direct a maximum of six potential interceptions per hour, and the flak gunners could not concentrate on all the available targets at once.

A typical bomber stream of 600 to 700 aircraft was on average 8 or 10 miles (13 or 16 km) broad, and 4,000 to 6,000 feet (1,200 to 1,800 m) deep.

The bomber stream allowed a bombing raid to be completed in a shorter time, further overwhelming the defensive tactics of the German forces. The earlier RAF tactic of sending bombers on individual routes meant that it could take four hours before all its planes would pass over their target; the bomber stream reduced this window to 90 minutes.

The first use of the bomber stream was the first 1,000 bomber raid against Cologne on the night of 30–31 May 1942.

The tactic proved successful and was used until the last days of the war, when centrally-organised German air defences had ceased to exist.

== See also ==
- Combat box
- List of World War II electronic warfare equipment
- No. 100 Group RAF
- Defence of the Reich
