= FuG 25a Erstling =

Type of aircraft transponder

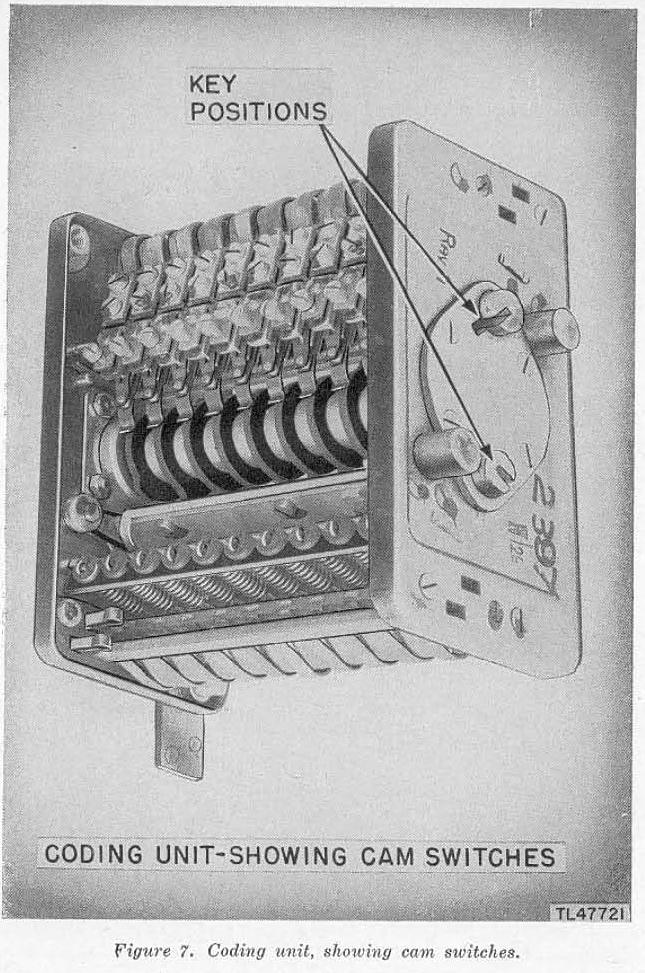
- An Erstling coding unit
- Country of origin: Germany
- Introduced: 1941
- Type: Identification Friend or Foe (IFF)

FuG 25a Erstling (German: "Firstborn", "Debut", sometimes FuGe) was an identification friend or foe (IFF) transponder installed in Luftwaffe aircraft starting in 1941 in order to allow German Freya radar stations to identify them as friendly. The system was also used as a navigation transponder as part of the EGON night bombing system during 1943 and 1944. It was the second German IFF system to be used, replacing the FuG 25 Zwilling.

The basic concept of IFF had been introduced in November 1938 but little work was carried out on it initially. In 1939 the Würzburg radar was chosen to replace an earlier fire control radar from Lorenz. This led to the Zwilling, which responded to the Würzburg signals. Meanwhile, the GEMA company introduced the long-range Freya radar and a more advanced IFF system to work with it. This Erstling unit was clearly superior to the Zwilling, but 10,000 Zwilling units had been produced and they were slow to abandon it. Starting in July 1942, the Würzburg units were equipped with a separate Kuh unit that broadcast pulses on Freya's 2.5 m band, allowing them to work with Erstling.

In theory, Erstling was more secure than its Allied IFF Mark III counterpart, as it responded with a morse code signal that changed day-to-day. In practice, the resulting complexity of the system was so great that it often did not work, and flak troops came to distrust it. By 1943, the use of IFF in Germany was highly confused due to the proliferating number of radar units, Allied jamming, and the fear among the pilots that the Allies were using IFF signals to track their aircraft. Attempts were made to replace Erstling on several occasions, but the chaotic nature of the late-war signals efforts meant the favoured FuG 226 Neuling never reached operational status.

The Royal Air Force did, eventually, use the Erstling signals to track German aircraft. After a Junkers Ju 88 night fighter landed in Scotland in 1943, they were able to reverse engineer the Erstling and introduced the Perfectos system to trigger it. The signals were superimposed on existing radar displays, allowing the Perfectos operator to measure both the direction and range to the Erstling-equipped aircraft. When night fighter losses suddenly spiked, German pilots were told to turn their Erstling units off, leading to friendly fire incidents.

== Operation ==
The basic system consisted of a transmitter/receiver, a "keying unit" to provide a secure day code, an integrated power supply, and a control panel. The power supply was fed by the aircraft's 24 V DC main power, driving a DC motor and alternator that produced 18 V AC 134 Hz output. This was used to power the electronics as well as a motor that drove the keying unit. The vacuum tube heater filaments were driven by the 24 V DC.

The receiver unit was an eight-tube superheterodyne design that was widely sensitive to the 2.4 m band. A 3000 RPM motor drove a tuning capacitor through the Freya range from 123 to 128 MHz, sweeping up and then down the band over a period of 10 ms. The Freya normally used a pulse repetition frequency (PRF) of 500 Hz, so during the 10 ms period, the radar would broadcast five pulses, and given that it was sweeping up and down, the receiver would be tuned to the right frequency during perhaps two of those pulses. The result was a series of pulses of the intermediate frequency turning on and off at about 200 Hz.

This output is used to modulate the transmitter unit. This has two effects. One is that the Erstling transmitter broadcasts a similar pattern of pulses on a selected frequency between 150 and 160 MHz, normally 156 MHz. These are received by a separate receiver at the radar stations, which output the 200 Hz low-frequency audible tone when received. The transmission output also damps down the receiver sensitivity for a short period so other pulses will not be received. This later system means the system will only output a signal for powerful sources, damping down weaker pulses from more distant sources. A small part of the transmitted signal is siphoned off on the way to the antenna and used to light a neon lamp on the instrument panel in the aircraft, indicating that the system was responding to an interrogation, not just receiving it.

Between the receiver and transmitter is the keying unit. This consisted of two sets of motorized cam switches with ten cams on each shaft. The cams were engaged by two long keys that were inserted into the keying unit, selecting among a set of 1,000 possible patterns. The keys were inserted on the ground and could not be changed in flight, but a switch on the front panel selected which of the two patterns to use. The shafts completed a revolution in about 1 1/2 seconds, alternately allowing the 200 Hz signal through to the transmitter or blocking it. The end result was to reproduce a 10-bit morse code signal when interrogated.

At the Freya site, received signals were sent to a separate unit that filtered low frequency signals into a set of headphones. The radar operator could then listen to the code while the interrogation button was held down. The codes were changed every day, which provided considerable security.

== Kuh unit ==
The FuG 25a had been designed to work only with the Freya radar, while other IFF units were being designed to provide a signal for the Würzburg units. These used a different system where the receiver was set to trigger the transmitter when the PRF of the interrogator changed from the Würzburg's normal 3,750 Hz to 5,000 Hz. The system was never made to work correctly, and by 1942 as the tempo of night fighter operations began to rapidly increase, an expedient solution was needed.

This came in the form of the Q-Gerät or Kuh (German for "cow") transmitter and Gämse (German for "chamois") receiver. The Kuh was a simple system that broadcast low-power signals similar to that of a Freya when triggered by the IFF switch on the Würzburg it was connected to, while the Gämse was an equally simple receiver turned to 156 MHz and then to the same filter as the Freya receiver. Thus when the operator pressed the interrogate button they heard the same signal as they would on the Freya.

== Countermeasures ==
=== Red Queen ===
British intelligence learned of the FuG 25 quite early-on and had published a report on the topic in 1943. At the time, there were only six units known to have been completed. Rennie Whitehead, who led the design of the British IFF Mark III, read the report and asked if there were circuit diagrams available. Instead, he was handed one of the units. A short time later, he was presented with a second unit. It was revealed that this unit had come from an operational German aircraft. In a fit of bravado, the pilot decided to show off by flying aerobatics just off the English coast. This ended when he crashed his aircraft into the coastline, the FuG unit surviving and landing in a bush unharmed.

In early 1944 the Luftwaffe began a low-intensity bombing effort against England. These raids sent up about sixty aircraft, but it was obvious from the start they were being led by a much smaller number of pathfinder aircraft dropping flares. At one of A. P. Rowe's "Sunday Soviets", Whitehead suggested that they might be using the FuG as a navigation tool, which would explain why no radio beam could be detected. While jamming such a signal would be easy by sending out pulses on the known frequency, Whitehead suggested instead that they modify their ground controlled interception radars to trigger the unit, which would make the pathfinder aircraft immediately stand out on the radar display. A small force of night fighters would also be equipped with an IFF Mark III modified to the same frequencies, so they would also be easy to identify.

This plan, which was christened "Red Queen", took two weeks to bring to fruition. The first operations were not highly effective, but as everyone became more familiar with the system, the effectiveness shot up. Because the radar now filtered out returns from any of the other bombers, as well as other British aircraft in the area, it became a trivial matter for the operators to guide the specially selected Mosquitos directly at the German pathfinders, quickly shooting down half of them. This resulted in the raids being thrown into disarray, and replacement pathfinders were shot down as soon as they arrived. The entire effort was called off after six ineffectual weeks.

=== Perfectos ===
The failure of the 1943 bombing raids meant that the FuG was once again being used primarily over Germany. In the summer of 1944, the first British Mosquito aircraft were equipped with the "Perfectos", a device that activated the FuG 25a and triggered the response in synchronicity with their own radar signal transmissions. This produced an additional blip on the radar display, which allowed the operators to immediately pick out the German night fighters.

When night fighter losses suddenly shot up, the Germans quickly realized that the FuG 25a had been compromised. The crews were told to leave the system turned off until they approached their bases, where local anti-aircraft batteries would have no problems shooting them down while they flew slowly at low altitude. Of course, tired crews landing at night often forgot to turn the system back on, and a number of German night fighters were shot down by German flak forces.

== Technical specifications ==
- Receiver: 125 MHz (Freya) and 550–580 MHz (Würzburg)
- Sensitivity: 2 mV
- Transmitter: 156 MHz
- Power: 0.2 Watt
- Activation: Radar pulses at 5000 Hz
- Encryption: 2x10 bit
- Range: 40 km (FuG 25z) and 270 km (FuG 25a)

	FuG 25z	FuG 25a
Reception frequencies	560 MHz	125 ±8 MHz
Transmission frequencies	560 MHz	156 MHz
Transmission power	unknown	400 W (PEP)
Current	4 A DC	4 A DC
Power supply	24 V DC	24 V DC
Weight	11 kg	17 kg
Tubes	6xRV12P2000, 1xLD1	7xRV12P2000, 1xRG12D60, 2xLD1, 1xLS50.
Range	72 km (45 miles)	roughly 80% of visual range, max. 270 km (170 miles)

== Safeguards ==
The Luftwaffe was known for fitting sensitive devices like "Erstling" with small explosive charges to allow their destruction in order to avoid capture. A short fuse allowed the crew to reach a minimum safe distance.

== See also ==
- Wilde Sau

== Literature ==
- Christian Möller, "Die Einsätze der Nachtschlachtgruppen 1, 2 und 20 an der Westfront von September 1944 bis Mai 1945", ISBN 978-3-938208-67-0
- Fritz Trenkle, "Die deutschen Funkführungsverfahren bis 1945", Dr. Alfred Hüthig Verlag Heidelberg, 1987, ISBN 3-7785-1647-7
- Werner Gierlach, "Flugmeldedienst", issue 8, Freya-Fibel, pages 43-44), Cologne
- TME 11-219 Directory of German Radar Equipment
