= Identification friend or foe =

Distinguishing friendly forces using coded radio frequency transponders

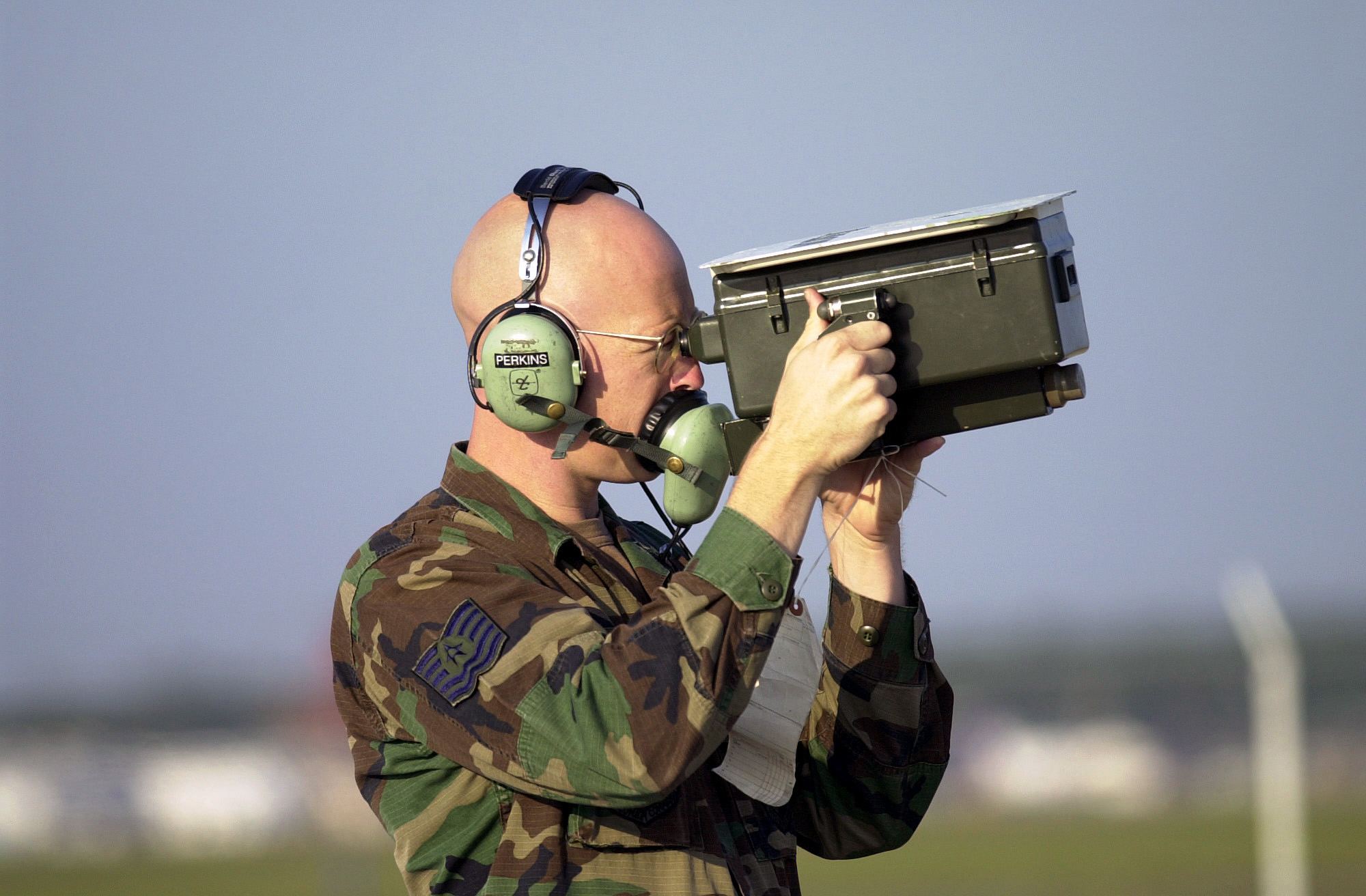
An IFF test set used by a United States Air Force avionics technician technical sergeant for testing transponders on aircraft in 2001.

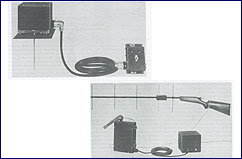
Model XAE IFF kit, the first radio recognition IFF system in the U.S.

Identification, friend or foe (IFF) is a combat identification system designed for command and control. It uses a transponder that listens for an interrogation signal and then sends a response that identifies the broadcaster. IFF systems usually use radar frequencies, but other electromagnetic frequencies, radio or infrared, may be used. It enables military interrogation systems to identify aircraft, vehicles, or forces as friendly, as opposed to neutral or hostile, and to determine their bearing and range from the interrogator.

With the successful deployment of radar systems for air defence during early World War II, combatants were immediately confronted with the difficulty of distinguishing friendly aircraft from hostile ones; by that time, aircraft were flown at high speed and altitude, making visual identification impossible, and the targets showed up as featureless blips on the radar screen. This led to incidents such as the Battle of Barking Creek, over Britain, and the air attack on the fortress of Koepenick over Germany. IFF systems were deployed by the RAF, the IFF Mark III, and Luftwaffe, FuG 25a Erstling, to help address these problems.

The US used British designs during the war, and the two countries began work on an updated model but the end of the war ended these efforts. After World War II, the US continued development of the improved system and introduced IFF Mark X operating at higher frequencies. They later added the ability to encode a short message consisting of four digits in the reply, which could be used to identify the exact aircraft or its altitude. This system was later adopted by ICAO as the air traffic control radar beacon system, ATCRBS. Today, this is the basis of most air traffic control systems, identifying individual aircraft on radar displays and improving the reliability of tracking information. This remains the primary way of routing traffic except in overocean and other long-distance routes, where satellite systems are being used to close the gaps. In satellite systems, the aircraft IFF periodically sends out an identification on its own, instead of having the satellite send an interrogation which could be picked up by thousands of aircraft.

IFF can only positively identify "friendly" objects. If an IFF interrogation receives no reply or an invalid reply, the object is not positively identified as foe; friendly forces may not properly reply to IFF for various reasons, such as an equipment malfunction, being near combat but not involved, or being a civilian light general aviation aircraft which may not carry a transponder.

IFF is a tool within the broader military action of combat identification (CID), the characterization of objects detected in the field of combat, with sufficient accuracy to support operational decisions. The broadest characterizations are those of friend, enemy, neutral, or unknown. CID can not only reduce friendly fire incidents, but also contributes to overall tactical decision-making.

== British development ==
=== Early concepts ===
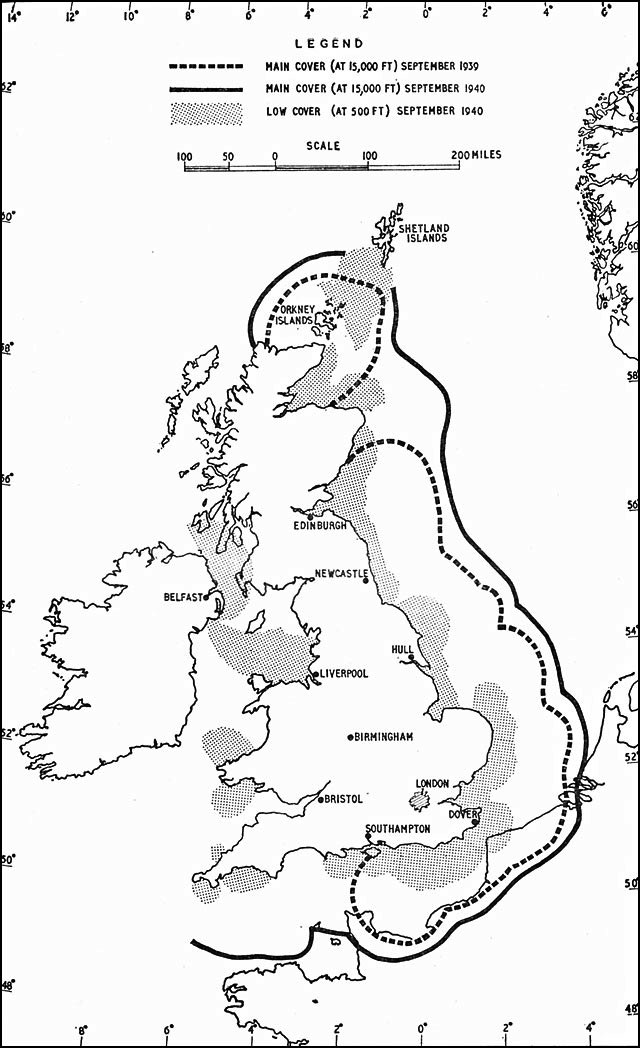
Radar coverage of the Chain Home system, 1939–40

Already before the deployment of their Chain Home radar system (CH), the RAF had considered the problem of IFF. Robert Watson-Watt had filed patents on such systems in 1935 and 1936. By 1938, researchers at Bawdsey Manor began experiments with "reflectors" consisting of dipole antennas tuned to resonate to the primary frequency of the CH radars. When a pulse from the CH transmitter hit the aircraft, the antennas would resonate for a short time, increasing the amount of energy returned to the CH receiver. The antenna was connected to a motorized switch that periodically shorted it out, preventing it from producing a signal. This caused the return on the CH set to periodically lengthen and shorten as the antenna was turned on and off. In practice, the system was found to be too unreliable to use; the return was highly dependent on the direction the aircraft was moving relative to the CH station, and often returned little or no additional signal.

It had been suspected from the start this system would be of little use in practice. When that turned out to be the case, the RAF turned to an entirely different system that had also been planned. This consisted of a set of tracking stations using HF/DF radio direction finders. The aircraft voice communications radios were modified to send out a 1 kHz tone for 14 seconds every minute, allowing the stations time to measure the aircraft's bearing. Several such stations were assigned to each "sector" of the air defence system, and sent their measurements to a plotting station at sector headquarters, where they used triangulation to determine the aircraft's location. Known as "pip-squeak", the system worked, but was labour-intensive and did not display its information directly to the radar operators, the information had to be forwarded to them over the telephone. A system that worked directly with the radar was clearly desirable.

=== IFF Mark I ===
The first active IFF transponder (transmitter/responder) was the IFF Mark I, which was used experimentally in 1939. This used a regenerative receiver, which fed a small amount of the amplified output back into the input, strongly amplifying even small signals as long as they were of a single frequency (like Morse code, but unlike voice transmissions). They were tuned to the signal from the CH radar (20–30 MHz), amplifying it so strongly that it was broadcast back out the aircraft's antenna. Since the signal was received at the same time as the original reflection of the CH signal, the result was a lengthened "blip" on the CH display which was easily identifiable. In testing, it was found that the unit would often overpower the radar or produce too little signal to be seen, and at the same time, new radars were being introduced using new frequencies.

=== IFF Mark II ===
Instead of putting Mark I into production, a new IFF Mark II was introduced in early 1940. Mark II had a series of separate tuners inside tuned to different radar bands that it stepped through using a motorized switch, while an automatic gain control solved the problem of it sending out too much signal. Mark II was technically complete as the war began, but a lack of sets meant it was not available in quantity and only a small number of RAF aircraft carried it by the time of the Battle of Britain. Pip-squeak was kept in operation during this period, but as the Battle ended, IFF Mark II was quickly put into full operation. Pip-squeak was still used for areas over land where CH did not cover, as well as an emergency guidance system.

=== IFF Mark III ===
Even by 1940 the complex system of Mark II was reaching its limits while new radars were being constantly introduced. By 1941, a number of sub-models were introduced that covered different combinations of radars, common naval ones for instance, or those used by the Army. But the introduction of radars based on the microwave-frequency cavity magnetron rendered this obsolete; there was simply no way to make a responder operating in this band using contemporary electronics.

In 1940, English engineer Freddie Williams had suggested using a single separate frequency for all IFF signals, but at the time there seemed no pressing need to change the existing system. With the introduction of the magnetron, work on this concept began at the Telecommunications Research Establishment as the IFF Mark III. This was to become the standard for the Western Allies for most of the war.

Mark III transponders were designed to respond to specific "interrogators", rather than replying directly to received radar signals. These interrogators worked on a limited selection of frequencies, no matter what radar they were paired with. The system also allowed limited communication to be made, including the ability to transmit a coded "mayday" response. The IFF sets were designed and built by Ferranti in Manchester to Williams' specifications. Equivalent sets were manufactured in the US, initially as copies of British sets, so that allied aircraft would be identified upon interrogation by each other's radar.

IFF sets were highly classified. Thus, many of them were wired with explosives in the event the aircrew bailed out or crash landed. Jerry Proc reports:

Alongside the switch to turn on the unit was the IFF destruct switch to prevent its capture by the enemy. Many a pilot chose the wrong switch and blew up his IFF unit. The thud of a contained explosion and the acrid smell of burning insulation in the cockpit did not deter many pilots from destroying IFF units time and time again. Eventually, the self destruct switch was secured by a thin wire to prevent its accidental use."

== Germany ==
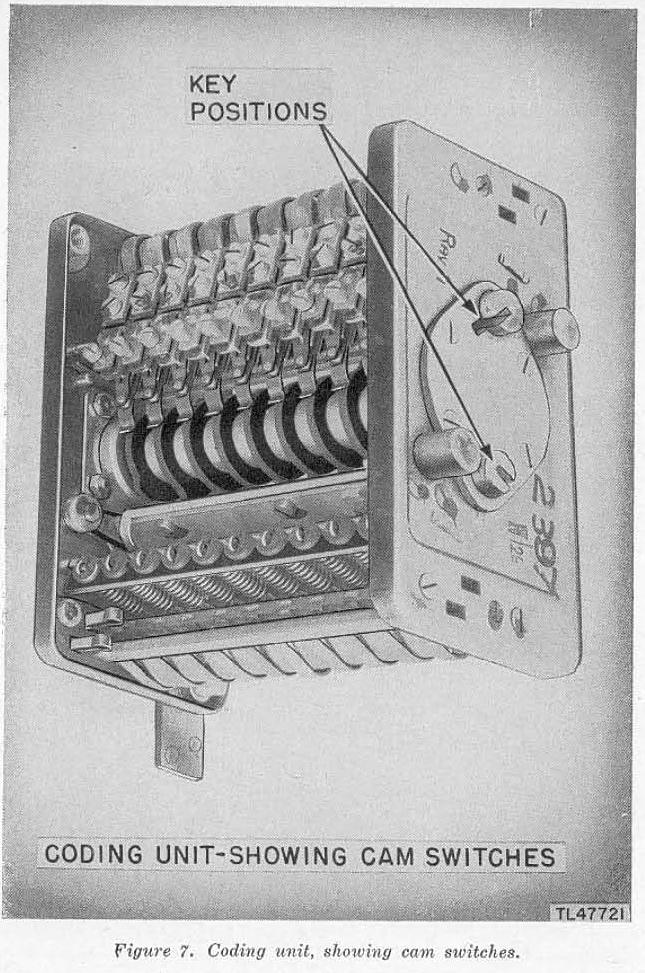
Code generator from German WW II IFF-Radio FuG 25a Erstling

FuG 25a Erstling (English: Firstborn, Debut) was developed in Germany in 1940. It was tuned to the low-VHF band at 125 MHz used by the Freya radar, and an adaptor was used with the low-UHF-banded 550–580 MHz used by Würzburg. Before a flight, the transceiver was set up with a selected day code of ten bits which was dialed into the unit. To start the identification procedure, the ground operator switched the pulse frequency of his radar from 3,750 Hz to 5,000 Hz. The airborne receiver decoded that and started to transmit the day code. The radar operator would then see the blip lengthen and shorten in the given code. The IFF transmitter worked on 168 MHz with a power of 400 watts (PEP).

The system included a way for ground controllers to determine whether an aircraft had the right code or not but it did not include a way for the transponder to reject signals from other sources. British military scientists found a way of exploiting this by building their own IFF transmitter called Perfectos, which were designed to trigger a response from any FuG 25a system in the vicinity. When an FuG 25a responded on its 168 MHz frequency, the signal was received by the antenna system from an AI Mark IV radar, which originally operated at 212 MHz and was relatively easy to convert to 168. By comparing the strength of the signal on different antennas the direction to the target could be determined. This allowed them to home in on the German aircraft. Mounted on Mosquitos, the "Perfectos" severely limited German use of the FuG 25a once they realized they were being tracked.

== Further wartime developments ==
=== IFF Mark IV and V ===
The United States Naval Research Laboratory had been working on their own IFF system since before the war. It used a single interrogation frequency, like the Mark III, but differed in that it used a separate responder frequency. Responding on a different frequency has several practical advantages, most notably that the response from one IFF cannot trigger another IFF on another aircraft. But it requires a complete transmitter for the responder side of the circuitry, in contrast to the greatly simplified regenerative system used in the British designs. This technique is now known as a cross-band transponder.

When the Mark II was revealed in 1941 during the Tizard Mission, it was decided to use it and take the time to further improve their experimental system. The result was what became IFF Mark IV. The main difference between this and earlier models is that it worked on higher frequencies, around 600 MHz, which allowed much smaller antennas. However, this also turned out to be close to the frequencies used by the German Würzburg radar and there were concerns that it would be triggered by that radar and the transponder responses would be picked on its radar display. This would immediately reveal the IFF's operational frequencies.

This led to a US–British effort to make a further improved model, the Mark V, also known as the United Nations Beacon or UNB. This moved to still higher frequencies around 1 GHz but operational testing was not complete when the war ended. By the time testing was finished in 1948, the much improved Mark X was beginning its testing and Mark V was abandoned.

In 1945, Emile Labin and Edwin Turner filed patents for radar IFF systems where the outgoing radar signal and the transponder's reply signal could each be independently programmed with a binary codes by setting arrays of toggle switches; this allowed the IFF code to be varied from day to day or even hour to hour.

== Postwar systems ==
=== IFF Mark X ===
Mark X started as a purely experimental device operating at frequencies above 1 GHz; the name refers to "experimental", not "number 10". As development continued it was decided to introduce an encoding system known as the "Selective Identification Feature", or SIF. SIF allowed the return signal to contain up to 12 pulses, representing four octal digits of 3 bits each. Depending on the timing of the interrogation signal, SIF would respond in several ways. Mode 1 indicated the type of aircraft or its mission (cargo or bomber, for instance) while Mode 2 returned a tail code.

Mark X began to be introduced in the early 1950s. This was during a period of great expansion of the civilian air transport system, and it was decided to use slightly modified Mark X sets for these aircraft as well. These sets included a new military Mode 3 which was essentially identical to Mode 2, returning a four-digit code, but used a different interrogation pulse, allowing the aircraft to identify if the query was from a military or civilian radar. For civilian aircraft, this same system was known as Mode A, and because they were identical, they are generally known as Mode 3/A.

Several new modes were also introduced during this process. Civilian modes B and D were defined, but never used. Mode C responded with a 12-bit number encoded using Gillham code, which represented the altitude as (that number) x 100 feet - 1200. Radar systems can easily locate an aircraft in two dimensions, but measuring altitude is a more complex problem and, especially in the 1950s, added significantly to the cost of the radar system. By placing this function on the IFF, the same information could be returned for little additional cost, essentially that of adding a digitizer to the aircraft's altimeter.

Modern interrogators generally send out a series of challenges on Mode 3/A and then Mode C, allowing the system to combine the identity of the aircraft with its altitude and location from the radar.

=== IFF Mark XII ===
The current (2018, Defense Security Cooperation Agency, Information on Identification, Friend or Foe (IFF) Systems, DSCA Policy 18-14 ) IFF system is the Mark XII. This works on the same frequencies as Mark X, and supports all of its military and civilian modes. (2018, as above: Defense Security Cooperation Agency. 2800 DEFENSE PENTAGON, WASHINGTON, D.C. 20301-2800)

It had long been considered a problem that the IFF responses could be triggered by any properly formed interrogation, and those signals were simply two short pulses of a single frequency. This allowed enemy transmitters to trigger the response, and using triangulation, an enemy could determine the location of the transponder. The British had already used this technique against the Germans during WWII, and it was used by the USAF against VPAF aircraft during the Vietnam War.

Mark XII differs from Mark X through the addition of the new military Mode 4. This works in a fashion similar to Mode 3/A, with the interrogator sending out a signal that the IFF responds to. There are two key differences, however.

One is that the interrogation pulse is followed by a 12-bit code similar to the ones sent back by the Mark 3 transponders. The encoded number changes day-to-day. When the number is received and decoded in the aircraft transponder, a further cryptographic encoding is applied. If the result of that operation matches the value dialled into the IFF in the aircraft, the transponder replies with a Mode 3 response as before. If the values do not match, it does not respond.

This solves the problem of the aircraft transponder replying to false interrogations, but does not completely solve the problem of locating the aircraft through triangulation. To solve this problem, a delay is added to the response signal that varies based on the code sent from the interrogator. When received by an enemy that does not see the interrogation pulse, which is generally the case as they are often below the radar horizon, this causes a random displacement of the return signal with every pulse. Locating the aircraft within the set of returns is a difficult process.

=== Mode S ===
During the 1980s, a new civilian mode, Mode S, was added that allowed greatly increased amounts of data to be encoded in the returned signal. This was used to encode the location of the aircraft from the navigation system. This is a basic part of the traffic collision avoidance system (TCAS), which allows commercial aircraft to know the location of other aircraft in the area and avoid them without the need for ground operators.

The basic concepts from Mode S were then militarized as Mode 5, which is simply a cryptographically encoded version of the Mode S data.

The IFF of World War II and Soviet military systems (1946 to 1991) used coded radar signals (called cross-band interrogation, or CBI) to automatically trigger the aircraft's transponder in an aircraft illuminated by the radar. Radar-based aircraft identification is also called secondary surveillance radar in both military and civil usage, with primary radar bouncing an RF pulse off of the aircraft to determine position. George Charrier, working for RCA, filed for a patent for such an IFF device in 1941. It required the operator to perform several adjustments to the radar receiver to suppress the image of the natural echo on the radar receiver, so that visual examination of the IFF signal would be possible.

== Early 21st century systems ==
The United States and other NATO countries started using a system called Mark XII in the late twentieth century; Britain had not until then implemented an IFF system compatible with that standard, but then developed a program for a compatible system known as successor IFF (SIFF).

Beginning around 2016, most NATO member states began upgrading their Mark XII systems to Mark XIIA Mode 5 where practicable. The transition from the legacy Mode 4 to Mode 5, however, has encountered several integration challenges—such as cryptographic key management, secure enrollment procedures, and ensuring interoperability with diverse legacy hardware. To mitigate these risks, backward compatibility with Mode 4 has been maintained longer than originally planned. According to DSCA Memorandum 18-14, this strategy permits a phased, mixed-mode operation until full Mode 5 fielding is achieved. DOT&E has overseen a series of test and evaluation efforts to ensure that Mode 5 meets NATO and DOD standards. In July 2014, DOT&E published the Mark XIIA Mode 5 Joint Operational Test Approach (JOTA) 2 Interoperability Assessment. This assessment evaluated the performance of various interrogators and transponders within a system‐of‐systems environment, based on a joint operational test conducted off the U.S. East Coast, and identified both successes and deficiencies that necessitated additional testing.

More recently, the 2021 DOT&E Mark XIIA Mode 5 Test Methodology outlined updated evaluation criteria, test procedures, and integration strategies aimed at resolving persistent issues and verifying that the new systems conform to the required operational and security standards. In accordance with STANAG 4570, it is anticipated that by 2030 every interrogator and transponder within NATO will be Mode 5 capable—further standardizing operations and enhancing overall security.

In parallel with military IFF developments, emerging civil and dual-use technologies have begun addressing identification challenges in low-altitude airspace, particularly with the rapid proliferation of unmanned aerial vehicles (UAVs). One such concept is ASO UAID (Unified Airspace Identification), which introduces a digital identity layer for UAV operations. UAID systems are designed to enable real-time verification, monitoring, and control of UAV activity by assigning and managing unique, persistent identifiers within a networked surveillance environment. Unlike traditional IFF systems, which are primarily focused on cooperative military platforms, UAID aims to integrate heterogeneous UAVs—including commercial and autonomous systems—into a unified airspace management framework. This approach supports enhanced situational awareness, regulatory compliance, and security in increasingly congested low-altitude airspace, and is considered a complementary layer to existing identification and surveillance technologies.

== Modes ==
- Mode 1: military only; provides 2-digit octal (6 bit) "mission code" that identifies the aircraft type or mission.
- Mode 2: military only; provides 4-digit octal (12 bit) unit code or tail number.
- Mode 3/A: military/civilian; provides a 4-digit octal (12 bit) identification code for the aircraft, assigned by the air traffic controller. Commonly referred to as a squawk code.
- Mode C: is a civilian mode which allows the reporting of altitude
- Mode 4: military only; provides a 3-pulse reply, delay is based on the encrypted challenge.
- Mode 5: military only; provides a cryptographically secured version of Mode S and ADS-B GPS position.

Modes 4 and 5 are designated for use by NATO forces.

== Submarines ==
In World War I, eight submarines were sunk by friendly fire and in World War II nearly twenty were sunk this way. Still, IFF was not regarded as a high concern before the 1990s by the US military as comparatively few non-allied nations possessed submarines.

IFF methods that are analogous to aircraft IFF have been deemed unfeasible for submarines because they would make submarines easier to detect. Thus, having friendly submarines broadcast a signal, or somehow increase the submarine's signature (based on acoustics, magnetic fluctuations etc.), are not considered viable. Instead, submarine IFF is done based on carefully defining areas of operation. Each friendly submarine is assigned a patrol area, where the presence of any other submarine is deemed hostile and open to attack. Further, within these assigned areas, surface ships and aircraft refrain from any anti-submarine warfare (ASW); only the resident submarine may target other submarines in its own area. Ships and aircraft may still engage in ASW in areas that have not been assigned to any friendly submarines. Navies also use database of acoustic signatures to attempt to identify the submarine, but acoustic data can be ambiguous and several countries deploy similar classes of submarines.

== See also ==
- Automatic target recognition
- Blue force tracking
- Challenge–response authentication
- List of World War II electronic warfare equipment
- Nelson Chequer, early 19th-century identification pattern
- Invasion stripes
