= Pip-squeak =

British radio navigation system

Pip-squeak was a radio navigation system used by the British Royal Air Force during the early part of World War II. Pip-squeak used an aircraft's voice radio set to periodically send out a 1 kHz tone which was picked up by ground-based high-frequency direction finding (HFDF, "huff-duff") receivers. Using three HFDF measurements, observers could determine the location of friendly aircraft using triangulation.

Pip-squeak was used by fighter aircraft during the Battle of Britain as part of the Dowding system, where it provided the primary means of locating friendly forces, and indirectly providing identification friend or foe (IFF). At the time, radar systems were sited on the shore and did not provide coverage over the inland areas, so IFF systems that produced unique radar images were not always useful for directing interceptions. Pip-squeak was added to provide coverage in these areas. As more radar stations were added and over-land areas became widely covered, pip-squeak was replaced by IFF systems of increasing sophistication.

Pip-squeak gets its name from a contemporary comic strip, Pip, Squeak and Wilfred. It was first implemented in the TR.9D radio. The system was also used by the USAAF, where the equipment was known as RC-96A.

== Background ==
=== Before radar ===
By the middle of 1930, the Air Defence of Great Britain (ADGB) group within the Royal Air Force was planning its response to the threat of air attack. This involved the construction of a large number of acoustic mirrors to provide early warning, along with a network of observer stations that would soon be arranged into the Royal Observer Corps (ROC). The system would provide defence around the London area only, starting on the coast from Suffolk to Sussex with a thin belt of anti-aircraft artillery, a fighter operating area inland, and a second group of guns in or near the city. The system was basically unchanged in operation from its World War I counterpart, but greatly expanded the area allotted to the fighters.

In tests carried out primarily from Biggin Hill during the mid-1930s, the expanded fighter operating area demonstrated a serious problem keeping track of friendly forces. Especially as altitudes increased or the weather grew more cloudy, observers could no longer keep track or identify fighters. This made it impossible for the centralized control and tracking centres to properly direct the fighters to their targets. Radio location was noted as a solution to this problem early on.

=== Huff-duff ===
Shortly after taking over command of the ADGB system and combining it into the main Fighter Command network, Hugh Dowding made the installation of high-frequency direction finding, or "huff-duff", sets a priority. In the summer of 1937 he requested that every sector be equipped with three huff-duff sets in order to allow rapid triangulation of the location of fighters. Coincident with this was the deployment of the latest version of the widely used TR.9 radio set, the TR.9B.

The Air Staff was slow to respond to Dowding's request due to a shortage of cathode ray tubes (CRTs) used in the huff-duff sets, and by the end of 1937 only five sectors were equipped. During tests in March 1938, the value of DF as part of the reporting system became very clear to all involved, and on 14 April 1938 the Air Ministry ordered a further 29 sets to equip all sectors. These were initially delivered without a CRT and required longer to reliably determine direction using a manual radiogoniometer, but were designed to be upgraded as CRTs arrived.

=== Pip-squeak ===
Throughout 1938, the Royal Aircraft Establishment worked on a new version of the TR.9 set, the "D" model, which was designed specifically to aid DF operators. This model included a single transmission amplifier, but two radio frequency oscillators, allowing the set to be quickly switched between two broadcast frequencies. Using one for voice and the other for DF, aircraft could broadcast a DF signal on the separate channel without disrupting other aircraft's communications on the voice channel.

Key to the system was the addition of a tone-generating oscillator that produced a 1 kHz tone, the "squeak". When keyed into the TR.9D's transmitter, it produced a distinctive tone that was easy to locate on the huff-duff sets. To further improve operation, an automatic switch was installed that switched the radio to the DF broadcast frequency and turned on the oscillator, then turned it back off again after a set period. To indicate that the system was active, the same 1 kHz tone was also played into the pilot's headphones, at a muted level.

=== Introduction of IFF ===
Some experimental use of IFF systems had taken place as early as 1936, but these passive "reflector" systems proved almost useless. An active transponder system based around a regenerative receiver had been introduced in 1939, but demonstrated problems with gain settings and had the disadvantage that it could only work with the Chain Home radars.

These problems were addressed in the IFF Mark II, which had an automatic gain control and several internal receivers that could respond to any of the popular radars of the era. Mark II was a great advance, but it became available in 1940 just as the Battle of Britain was opening. Deliveries were forced to wait until the Battle ended, at which point they were rapidly installed across much of the RAF fleet.

IFF theoretically made pip-squeak redundant, but a lack of radar coverage over inland areas kept it in use. New radars, notably the AMES Type 7, began to fill in these areas through 1941. Pip-squeak remained in use after this period as an emergency navigation system in the case when an aircraft was lost, allowing the ground operators to locate an aircraft using their voice radios.

== Description ==
=== Broadcaster ===
Pip-squeak's airborne unit consisted of two primary parts, an oscillator to produce a whistle at 1 kHz, and a mechanical clock with electrical contacts to periodically switch the oscillator and DF broadcast channel on and off. Using the TR.9D, the most common radio during the early stages of the war, there were two available channels, and the frequencies were selected before the mission using swappable crystal oscillators. Both the section leader and one other aircraft in the section normally had pip-squeak aboard.

Shortly after forming up after a scramble, the squadron leaders would be asked to ready their pip-squeak clocks. In the original system this required them to turn the "wind" knob that moved the single second-hand counter-clockwise around the face of the clock. There were up to four sections of aircraft in each squadron, although most squadrons had two or three sections at any given time. Each section had its own position for the hand; red section had the 12 o'clock location, yellow was at 9 o'clock, blue at 6 o'clock and green at 3 o'clock.

Once the clocks were properly positioned, the sector controller would initiate a countdown, Synchronize time, 5, 4, 3, 2, 1, mark. At mark, the pilots would turn on the clock, which would start the second hand moving clockwise. When the hand reached the 12 o'clock position the oscillator was automatically turned on, and it turned off again just before the 3 o'clock position, broadcasting for 14 seconds per minute. The system also automatically switched the radio from voice to pip-squeak channel at the 12 o'clock location; if the pilot was talking he would be cut off.

Red section, having started in the 12 o'clock position, started broadcasting immediately when the system was activated. When it stopped 14 seconds later, yellow section's clock was now reaching the 12 o'clock position and began to broadcast, and so forth. Over a one-minute period, all four sections (if present) squeaked and could be located.

A separate radio control switch stopped the radio signal from broadcasting while the clock continued to move. This allowed the pilot to set up the system early in the flight, and then turn it off when better communications were needed, like in combat. The system could then be turned on again at any time, with the clock still in the proper position. Sector Commanders could ask pilots to turn it on by asking "Is your Cockerel crowing?".

There were two common versions of pip-squeak, one with the clock located in the cockpit, and a second that used a remote clock system. The later placed the "Master Contactor" in a box in the equipment bay near the radio, and it was pre-set to the correct second-hand location for each section, prior to the mission. The "Remote Contactor" display was located in the cockpit, driven by electrical signals from the Master Contactor, whose once-per-second signals powered a stepper motor driving the second hand. This version had only a single control to turn the clock on and off to start it up at "mark", a separate switch on the radio console allowed the signal to be stopped and started while leaving the clock running.

=== Plotting ===
Each sector was equipped with three huff-duff sets for determining the location of the pip-squeak radios. Although in theory only two were needed, adding a third offered redundancy as well as helping reduce the chance of errors in the plotting. The stations were positioned approximately 30 miles (48 km) apart in as close to an equilateral triangular layout as possible. One of the three stations was co-located at the Sector Control center, with the two remote stations communicating with the center over telephone lines.

At the Sector Control, a simple system was used to rapidly take a "fix". This consisted of a circular plotting board with a map on the top surface marked with the Ordnance Survey National Grid, and a series of compass angles on a protractor around the outer edge. The location of the three stations was represented by small holes drilled into the map. Weighed strings passed through the holes, and could be pulled up and across the map by the plotters. When a report was received from a huff-duff operator, the plotter would pull their string so it lay on the indicated angle; the weight (or elastic cord) on the other end kept the string taut.

With the three reports plotted, the strings would normally intersect at a small triangle or star somewhere on the map. This location was read against the Grid. The operators could identify which section they were tracking simply by looking at a sector clock painted with section colours, as the sections had manually synchronized their clocks with this one. A fourth operator observing the plots would then call in the position to the main operations room. The system required fast operations by all involved, as they had only 14 seconds to make a plot before the next section reported in.

When the grid location was passed to the operations room, a marker for that section could be updated on the sector's plotting table. Pip-squeak did not directly produce identification friend or foe (IFF) information, but served that purpose in practice by allowing the operators to determine which plots were friendly. This might be used, for instance, when reports from radar or ROC observers were tracking friendly forces without knowing it.

== Problems ==
Although pip-squeak worked well in practice and could be used with any aircraft with a radio, it presented several practical problems that led to its eventual replacement.

The first was that the system used up a radio channel. As the TR.9D set had only two channels, using one for pip-squeak left only a single voice channel. All of the aircraft in the squadron shared the same frequencies for voice and pip-squeak, selected before the mission. This meant that squadrons could talk amongst themselves and to their Sector Operator, but could not coordinate with other squadrons or Sectors. Pilots were also constantly being interrupted when the pip-squeak timer activated. Things improved with the introduction of the TR.1388 sets, which had several voice channels and much longer range, but pip-squeak still interrupted the pilot when it broadcast.

Further, the pip-squeak system required an entirely separate reporting chain, along with the associated equipment, buildings, manpower and telephone systems. This information was primarily consumed by the Sector Controls, who had the responsibility for vectoring fighters onto targets, and thus required up-to-date information on the locations of their fighters. This meant that information about the location of friendly forces had to be sent back up the chain to Group and Fighter Command Headquarters, increasing the amount of traffic flowing through the system.

Pip-squeak was supplanted, and then replaced, by the IFF system. This was a self-contained transponder that was triggered by the signal of a radar being received by the aircraft. The transponder sent out a short radio pulse of its own when the radar signal was received. This signal was filtered out and sent to a separate amplifier at the radar station. The output was then mixed with the main signal and caused an upside-down blip to be displayed slightly after the main signal. This "secondary" return now gives its name to secondary radar, which forms the basis of most civilian radar systems.

IFF had been produced as early as 1939, but not widely used because the early Chain Home radar stations were placed along the shoreline, providing no coverage inland where much of the action took place. By 1942 the radar network had been extensively updated, especially with the introduction of the ground-controlled interception units, and the plotting of interceptions moved from the Sector Controls to the radar sets themselves. IFF was universal by this point.
