= Perfectos =

British WWII radio device

Perfectos was a radio device used by Royal Air Force Intruders during the Second World War to detect German night fighter aircraft. It was a development of the Red Queen system used by Allied night-fighters to detect German aircraft over Britain. It worked by triggering Luftwaffe's FuG 25a Erstling identification friend or foe (IFF) system and then using the response signal to determine the enemy aircraft's direction and range. This allowed RAF Intruders to track German aircraft without the need for a radar system of their own, in contrast to the earlier Serrate radar detector that lacked range information and thus required a radar of their own for the final approach.

The resulting rapid ramp-up of night fighter losses in late 1944 alerted the Germans that the RAF was deploying a system to track them, and suspicion immediately fell on the Erstling. Pilots were told to leave their Erstling units turned off until they approached friendly airbases, where it was needed in order for their flak units to avoid firing on them. This resulted in further chaos as tired crews often forgot to turn them back on, and flak units became increasingly paralyzed as friendly fire incidents mounted.
