= Junkers Ju 88 =

German twin engine multirole combat aircraft

Ju 88
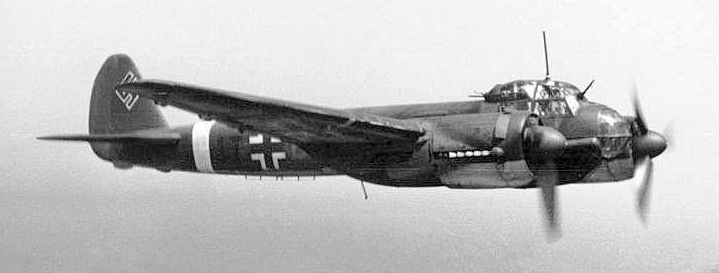
- A Ju 88A over France in 1942

General information
- Type: Tactical / dive / torpedo bomber; Night / heavy fighter; Reconnaissance aircraft
- Manufacturer: Junkers
- Designer: Ernst Zindel, W. H. Evers, and Alfred Gassner
- Primary users: Luftwaffe Finnish Air Force; Regia Aeronautica; Royal Romanian Air Force
- Number built: 15,183

History
- Introduction date: 1939
- First flight: 21 December 1936
- Retired: 1945 (Luftwaffe); 1951 (France)
- Variant: Junkers Ju 188

The Junkers Ju 88 is a twin-engined multirole combat aircraft designed and produced by the German aircraft manufacturer Junkers Aircraft and Motor Works. It was used extensively during the Second World War by the Luftwaffe and became one of the most versatile combat aircraft of the conflict.

The Ju 88 originated from a Reichsluftfahrtministerium (RLM) requirement issued in 1934 for a new multipurpose aircraft. Junkers was one of several firms to respond, producing two separate design studies that produced both the Ju 85 and Ju 88. The design work was headed by Junkers' chief designer Ernst Zindel. The Ju 88 was envisioned to function as a so-called Schnellbomber ("fast bomber") that would evade interception by enemy fighters of its era by flying at high speed. On 21 December 1936, the first prototype performed its maiden flight. The performance of the third prototype was highly favourable, resulting in the competing Henschel Hs 127 and Messerschmitt Bf 162 being abandoned. During late 1937, the Ju 88 was developed into a heavy dive bomber, but this feat proved to be too stressful for the airframe even with modifications.

A series of technical problems troubled the aircraft's development, delaying its introduction to squadron service from 1938 to September 1939, by which point the Second World War had already started. The Ju 88 first saw action with the Luftwaffe during the invasion of Poland. It would subsequently be deployed into numerous theatres of the conflict, including the Norwegian campaign, the Battle of France, the Battle of Britain, the invasion of Yugoslavia, the invasion of Greece, the Siege of Malta, the North African campaign, and the Eastern Front amongst others. While the Luftwaffe was the primary operator of the Ju 88, numerous other nation's air services also flew the type in quantity during the war; these include the Finnish Air Force, Regia Aeronautica and the Royal Romanian Air Force.

The Ju 88 was one of the Luftwaffe's most important and heavily used aircraft during the Second World War. The aircraft, akin to several other German bombers of the era, served as a bomber, dive bomber, night fighter, torpedo bomber, reconnaissance aircraft, and heavy fighter. Perhaps most unusually, it was adapted into a flying bomb towards the end of the war. The assembly line ran constantly from 1936 to 1945, building in excess of 15,000 Ju 88s across dozens of variants, making it the most-produced twin-engine German aircraft of the period and the second-most produced bomber of all time behind the four-engined Consolidated B-24 Liberator. Throughout its production run, the basic structure of the Ju 88 remained unchanged.

== Design and development ==
=== Background ===
The origins of the Ju 88 can be traced back to the Reichsluftfahrtministerium (RLM) and the formulation of a new requirement in 1934 that called for a new multipurpose aircraft. This requirement quickly attracted attention from the German aircraft industry. In August 1935, the RLM revised its requirements towards the concept of a Schnellbomber, a high-speed bomber that lacked defensive turrets, seated a crew of three, and carried a payload of 800–1,000 kg (1,800–2,200 lb). This requirement was issued to four aircraft manufacturers, Focke Wulf, Henschel, Junkers, and Messerschmitt; all firms except Focke Wulf responded.

The Junkers design team made two design studies in parallel; work began on 15 January 1936. The studies produced two distinct, yet similar, aircraft, the Ju 85 and Ju 88. Both aircraft were twin-engined bombers, the main difference between the two being the Ju 85's use of a twin fin (and twin rudder) tail while the Ju 88 had a single fin (and rudder) tail.. Following deliberation amongst officials, the RLM decided in favour of the Ju 88. The passed-over Ju 85 was never put into service.

The detailed design work was performed by Junkers chief designer Ernst Zindel. He was assisted by Wilhelm Heinrich Evers and an American engineer Alfred Gassner. Evers and Gassner had worked together at Fokker Aircraft Corporation of America where Gassner had been Chief Engineer. Junkers presented their initial design in June 1936, and were given clearance to build two prototypes (Werknummer 4941 and 4942). The first two aircraft were to have a range of 2,000 km (1,200 mi) and were to be powered by two Daimler-Benz DB 600s. Three further aircraft, Werknummer 4943, 4944 and 4945, were to be powered by Junkers Jumo 211 engines. The first two prototypes, Ju 88 V1 and V2, differed from the V3, V4 and V5 in that the latter three models were equipped with three defensive armament positions to the rear of the cockpit, and were able to carry two 1,000 kg (2,200 lb) bombs, one under each inner wing panel.

=== Into flight ===
On 21 December 1936, the aircraft's maiden flight was performed by the prototype Ju 88 V1, which bore the civil registration D-AQEN. During its first flight, it managed to reach a speed of about 580 km/h (360 mph). On 10 April 1937, the first prototype was lost in an accident. The third prototype, Ju 88 V3, which made its first flight on 13 September 1937 and was the first to be powered by the Jumo 211A engine, participated in a series of extensive tests at the Rechlin experimental station. According to the aviation authors J.R. Smith and Antony Kay, the results of this evaluation were so positive that all work on the competing Henschel Hs 127 and Messerschmitt Bf 162 was abandoned quickly thereafter.

Upon reviewing the Ju 88's performance, Hermann Göring, head of the Luftwaffe, was reportedly ecstatic; it was allegedly viewed as an aircraft that could finally fulfil the promise of the Schnellbomber. The streamlined fuselage was modelled after its contemporary, the Dornier Do 17, but furnished with fewer defensive guns as a result of the belief still held that it could outrun late 1930s-era fighters. During March 1939, the fifth prototype set a 1,000 km (620 mi) closed-circuit record while carrying a 2,000 kg (4,400 lb) payload at a speed of 517 km/h (321 mph).

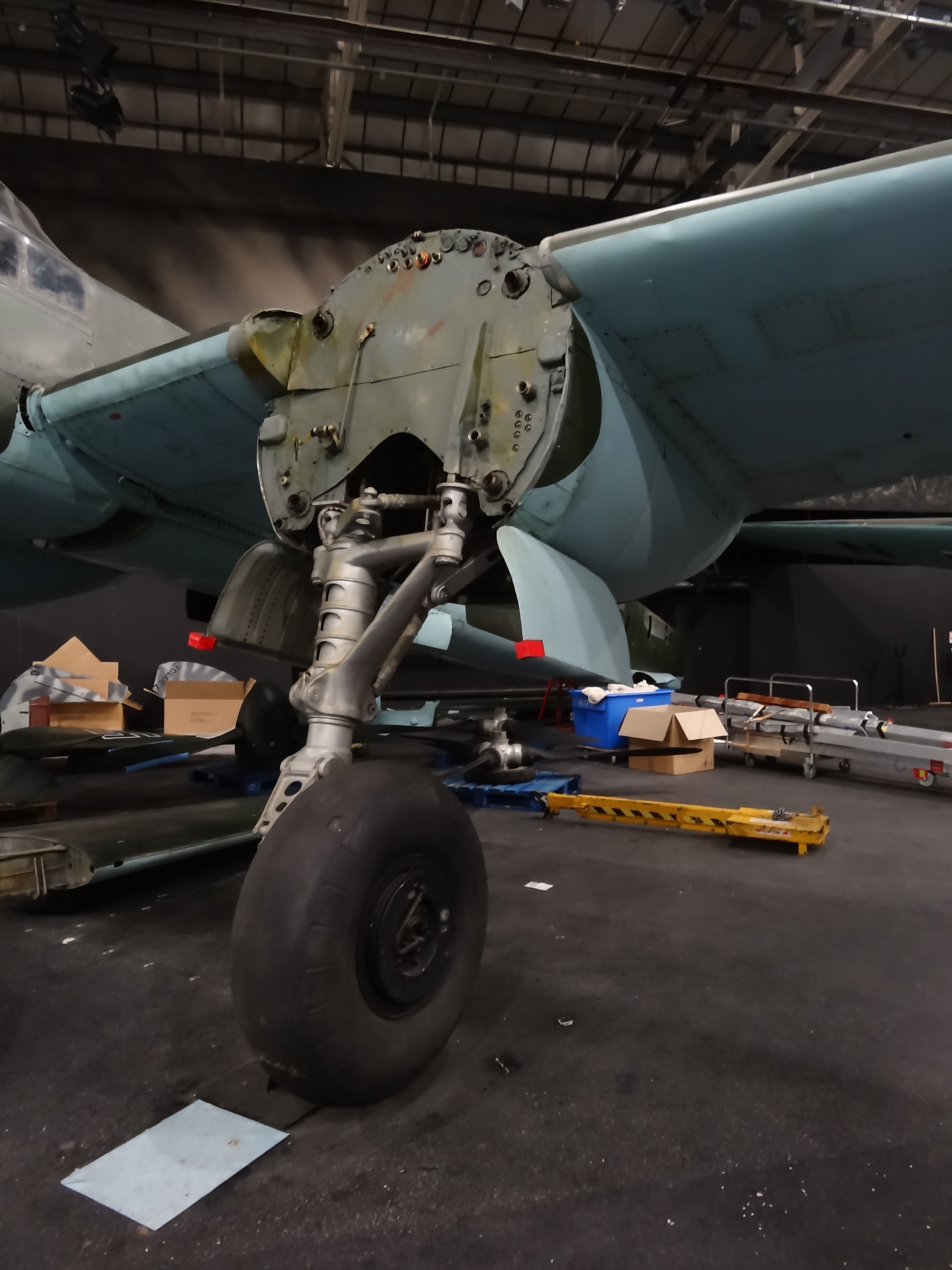
Standard Ju 88 main landing gear installation, from the V6 prototype onwards

The first five prototypes had conventionally-operating dual-strut leg rearwards-retracting main gear, however, starting with the V6 prototype, a main gear design debuted that twisted the new, single-leg main gear strut through 90° during the retraction sequence, much like that of the American Curtiss P-40 Warhawk fighter. This feature allowed the main wheels to end up above the lower end of the strut when fully retracted (Note: Animation) and was adopted as standard for all future production Ju 88s, and only minimally modified for the later Ju 188 and 388 developments of it. These single-leg landing gear struts also made use of stacks of conical Belleville washers inside them as their main form of suspension for takeoffs and landings.

By 1938, the design had received a series of radical modifications to adapt the Ju 88 to function as a "heavy" dive bomber in response to a request from the RLM. These changes, which were first implemented on the V8 and V9 prototypes, included the strengthening of the wings, the addition of dive brakes, an extended fuselage, and the number of crewmen being increased to four.

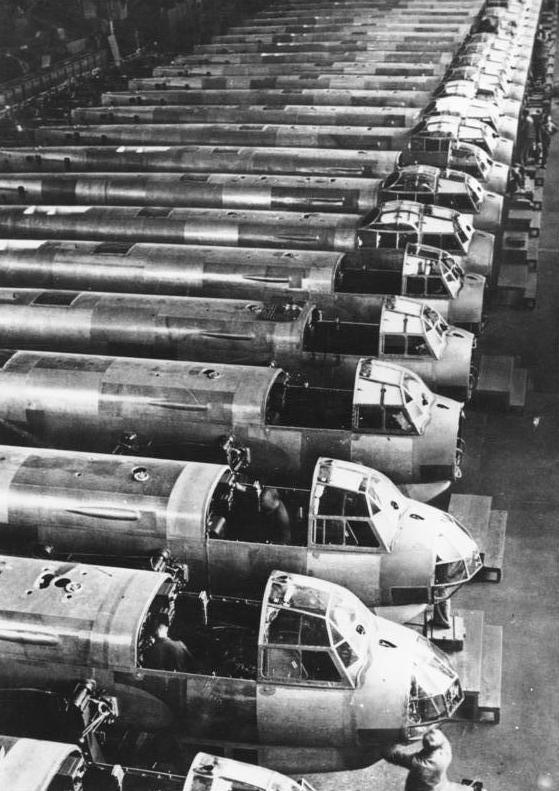
Ju 88 assembly line, 1941

During August 1938, Generalluftzeugmeister Ernst Udet had set out the Takt system of construction for large state-owned firms, including Junkers. Almost all of the tooling and jigs were produced at the company's facility in Schönebeck; the wing and tail sections were constructed at Halberstadt and Leopoldschall while the fuselage was originally produced as two separate shells that were brought together at Aschersleben. Later on, fuselage construction was broken down further, a decision that made it easier to produce the numerous variations of the Ju 88. During early 1939, a pre-production batch of ten Ju 88A-0s was completed to conduct service trials of the type; the A-0 series were almost entirely identical to the Ju 88 V10 prototype.

As the outbreak of the Second World War approached, by the time Luftwaffe planners such as Udet had their opportunities to have their own "pet" features added (including dive-bombing by Udet), the Ju 88's top speed had dropped to around 450 km/h (280 mph). The Ju 88 V7 was fitted with cable-cutting equipment to combat the potential threat of British barrage balloons, and was successfully tested in this role; the V7 also had the Ju 88 A-1 "beetle's eye" faceted nose glazing installed, complete with the Bola undernose ventral defensive machine gun emplacement, and was put through a series of dive-bombing tests with 250 and 500 kg (550 and 1,100 lb) bombs, and in early 1940, with 1,000 kg (2,200 lb) bombs. The A-1 series prototypes were Wrk Nrs 0003, 0004 and 0005. The A-1s were given the Jumo 211B-1 or G powerplants.

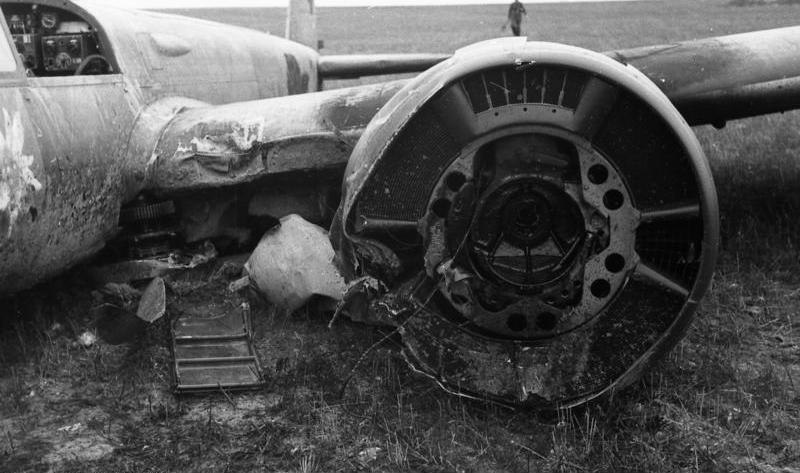
Annular radiator on a wrecked Ju 88

The choice of annular radiators for engine cooling on the Ju 88, which placed these radiators immediately forward of each engine and directly behind each propeller, allowed the cooling lines for the engine coolant and oil-cooling radiators (integrated within the annular design) to be as short as possible, with integral port and starboard air intakes for cooling the exhaust headers, the starboard inlet also supplying the inlet air for the supercharger.

During autumn of 1938, Dr. Heinrich Koppenberg (managing director of Jumo) assured Göring that a production rate of 300 Ju 88s per month was definitely achievable; indeed, such a rate was achieved during 1940. However, the pre-war ramping up of production was delayed drastically by developmental problems. Although planned for a service introduction in 1938, the Ju 88 finally entered squadron service (with only 12 aircraft) on the first day of the invasion of Poland in 1939. Production was painfully slow at this point, only a single Ju 88 was being manufactured per week as problems kept cropping up. The Ju 88C series of heavy fighter was also designed in early 1940, but its existence was kept secret from Göring, as he only sought bombers at this time.

=== Dive bomber ===
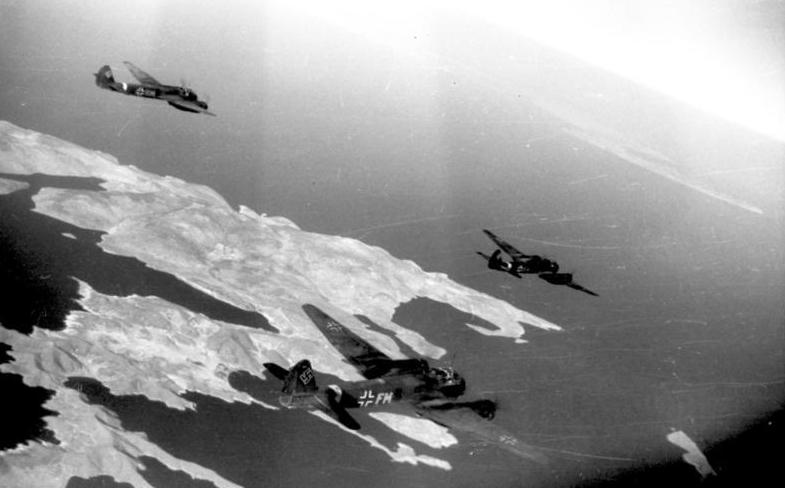
Three Ju 88s in flight over Astypalaia, Greece, 1943

In October 1937, Ernst Udet had ordered the development of the Ju 88 as a heavy dive bomber. This decision was influenced by the success of the Ju 87 Stuka in this role. The Junkers development centre at Dessau gave priority to the study of pull-out systems and dive brakes. The first prototype to be tested as a dive bomber was the Ju 88 V4 followed by the V5 and V6. These models became the planned prototype for the A-1 series. The V5 made its maiden flight on 13 April 1938, and the V6 on 28 June 1938. Both the V5 and V6 were fitted with four-blade propellers, an extra bomb bay and a central "control system". Following the release of the bombs, the elevators automatically moved to their full-up position to bring the aircraft out of its dive and into a climb.

As a dive bomber, the Ju 88 was capable of pinpoint deliveries of heavy loads; however, despite all the modifications, dive bombing still proved too stressful for the airframe, and in 1943, tactics were changed so that bombs were delivered from a shallower, 45° diving angle. Aircraft and bomb sights were accordingly modified and dive brakes were removed. With an advanced Stuvi dive-bombsight, accuracy remained very good for its time. The maximum bomb load of the A-4 was 3,000 kg (6,600 lb), but in practice, standard bomb load was 1,500–2,000 kg (3,300–4,400 lb). Junkers later used the A-4 airframe for the A-17 torpedo carrier, which did not have the undernose Bola gondola for a ventral gun position.

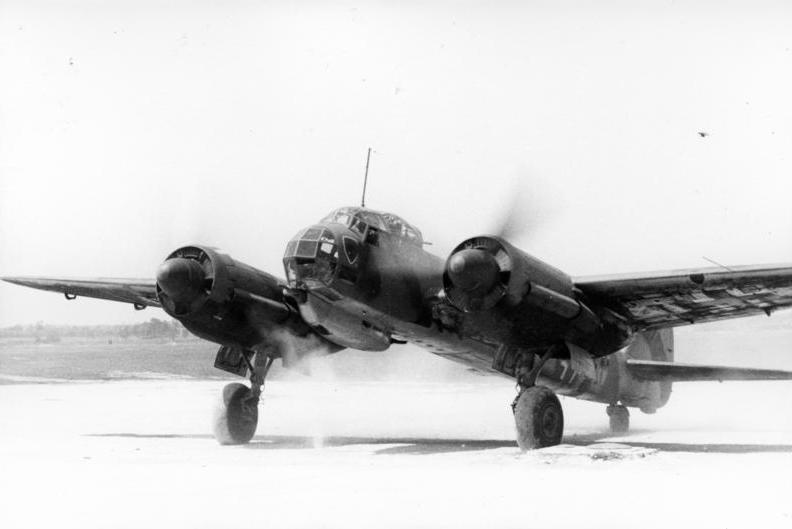
Ju 88 preparing for take off, Tunisia, c. 1942–43

=== Fighter-bomber ===
The Ju 88C series of standard fighter-bomber versions from the C-2 onwards culminated in the Ju 88 C-6, applying experience acquired with the A-4 bomber, equipped with the same Jumo 211J engines but replacing the "beetle's eye" nose glazing with a smoothly curved all-metal nose, pierced only by the barrels of its forward-firing offensive armament. The C-6 was used mostly as fighter-bomber and therefore assigned to bomber units. As a reaction to the increasing number of attacks on German shipping, especially on U-boats in the Bay of Biscay, from July 1942 it started flying anti-shipping patrols and escort missions from bases in France.

V./Kampfgeschwader 40 was specifically formed to operate the C-6. The aircraft of V./KG 40 (which was redesignated I./Zerstörergeschwader 1 in 1943) were a significant threat to antisubmarine aircraft and operated as escort fighters for the more vulnerable Focke-Wulf Fw 200 Condor maritime patrol bombers. Between July 1942 and July 1944, the Ju 88s of KG 40 and ZG 1 were credited with 109 confirmed air-to-air victories, at a cost of 117 losses. They were finally deployed against the Allied Invasion of Normandy in June 1944, incurring heavy losses for little effect before being disbanded on 5 August 1944. Some Ju 88 variants were also used as radio controlled bombs in the Mistel composite aircraft configuration, by coupling a bomber filled with explosive with a fighter such as the Focke-Wulf Fw 56 or the Messerschmitt Bf 109E.

=== Attack bomber ===
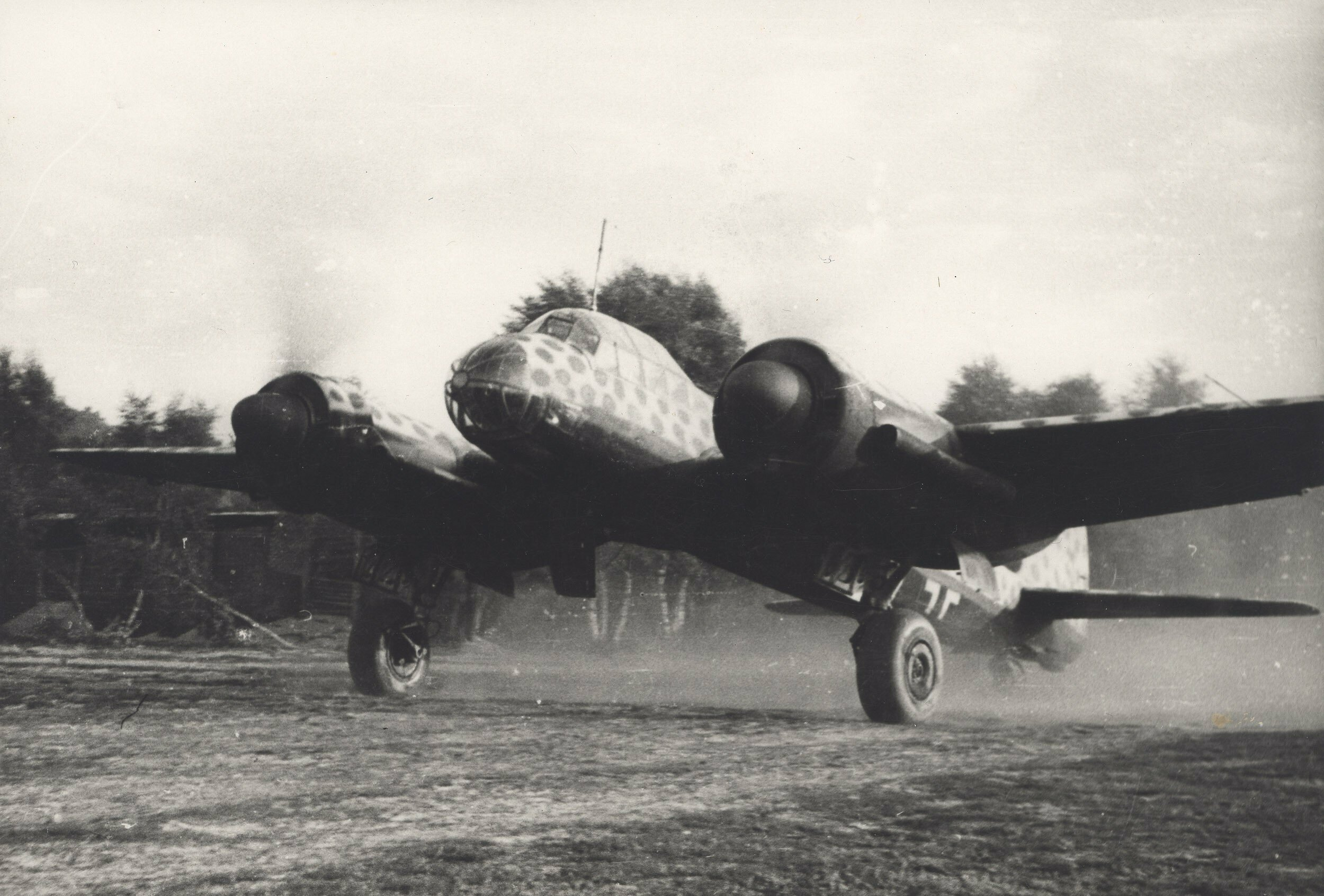
Ju 88 in 1944

The Ju 88P was a specialized variant for ground attack and to function as a bomber destroyer, designed starting from 1942 and produced in small numbers, using examples of the Bordkanone heavy calibre aviation autocannon series, which required the omission of the Bola undernose gondola for clearance. The prototype, derived from a standard Ju 88 A-4, was armed with a 75 mm (3.0 in) anti-tank gun derived from the 7.5 cm PaK 40 installed in a large conformal gun pod under the fuselage. This was followed by a small batch of Ju 88 P-1, which standardized the solid sheet metal nose of the C version for all known examples of the P-series, and used the new 75 mm (3.0 in) PaK 40L semi-automatic gun, also known as the Bordkanone BK 7,5, which was also meant for use in both the later Henschel Hs 129B-3 dedicated anti-armor aircraft, and a never-achieved production version of the He 177A-3/R5 ground-attack Flak-suppression Stalingradtyp field-improvised version. The Ju 88P-1 was produced in some 40 units, but with the massive cannon installation resulting in a slow and vulnerable aircraft, it was soon replaced by the Ju 88 P-2, featuring two Bordkanone 37 mm (1.5 in) BK 3,7 guns, whose higher muzzle velocity proved useful against the Russian tanks in the Eastern Front. This aircraft was used by Erprobungskommando 25. The Ju 88 P-3 also used the twin BK 37 guns, and added further armor for the crew, and was delivered at one Staffel of the Nachtschlachtgruppen 1, 2, 4, 8 and 9 for night attacks in the Eastern Front, in northern Norway (NSGr 8) and Italy (NSGr 9). Finally, the Ju 88 P-4 mounted a smaller-volume ventral gun pod housing a 50 mm (2.0 in) auto-loading Bordkanone BK 5 cannon (the same ordnance used for the field-improvised handful of Stalingradtyp He 177As created) and, in some cases, 65 mm (2.6 in) solid propellant rockets.

=== Heavy fighter and night fighter ===
==== Ju 88C ====
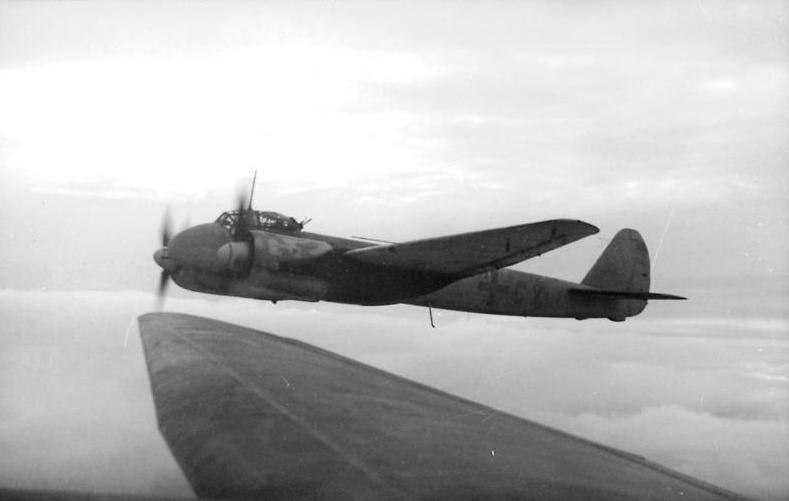
Ju 88C series heavy fighter in flight

The Ju 88 V19 (W.Nr. 0373) was a test bed for the Ju 88C series. The Ju 88C was originally intended as a fighter-bomber and heavy fighter by adding fixed, forward-firing guns to the nose while retaining some bomb carrying ability of the A-series bomber. The C-series had a solid metal nose, typically housing one 20 mm (0.787 in) MG FF cannon and three 7.92 mm (0.312 in) MG 17 machine guns. The aircraft retained the ventral Bola gondola under the crew compartment though individual units sometimes removed this to reduce weight and drag to enhance performance. The Ju 88C was later used as a night fighter, and this became its main role.

The first version of the Ju 88C was the C-1 with 20 aircraft converted from A-1 airframes. Some of them entered service in the Zerstörerstaffel of KG 30 which became part of II./NJG 1 in July 1940. The C-1 was followed by the C-2 of which 20 aircraft were converted from A-5 airframes with enlarged wingspan. The C-4 became the first production version with 60 produced and 60 converted from A-5 airframes. The C-6, of which 900 aircraft were produced, was based on the A-4 airframe with more powerful engines and stronger defensive armament (single- or dual-mount belt-fed 7.92 mm (0.312 in) MG 81 or 13 mm (0.512 in) MG 131 instead of drum-fed MG 15 machine guns).

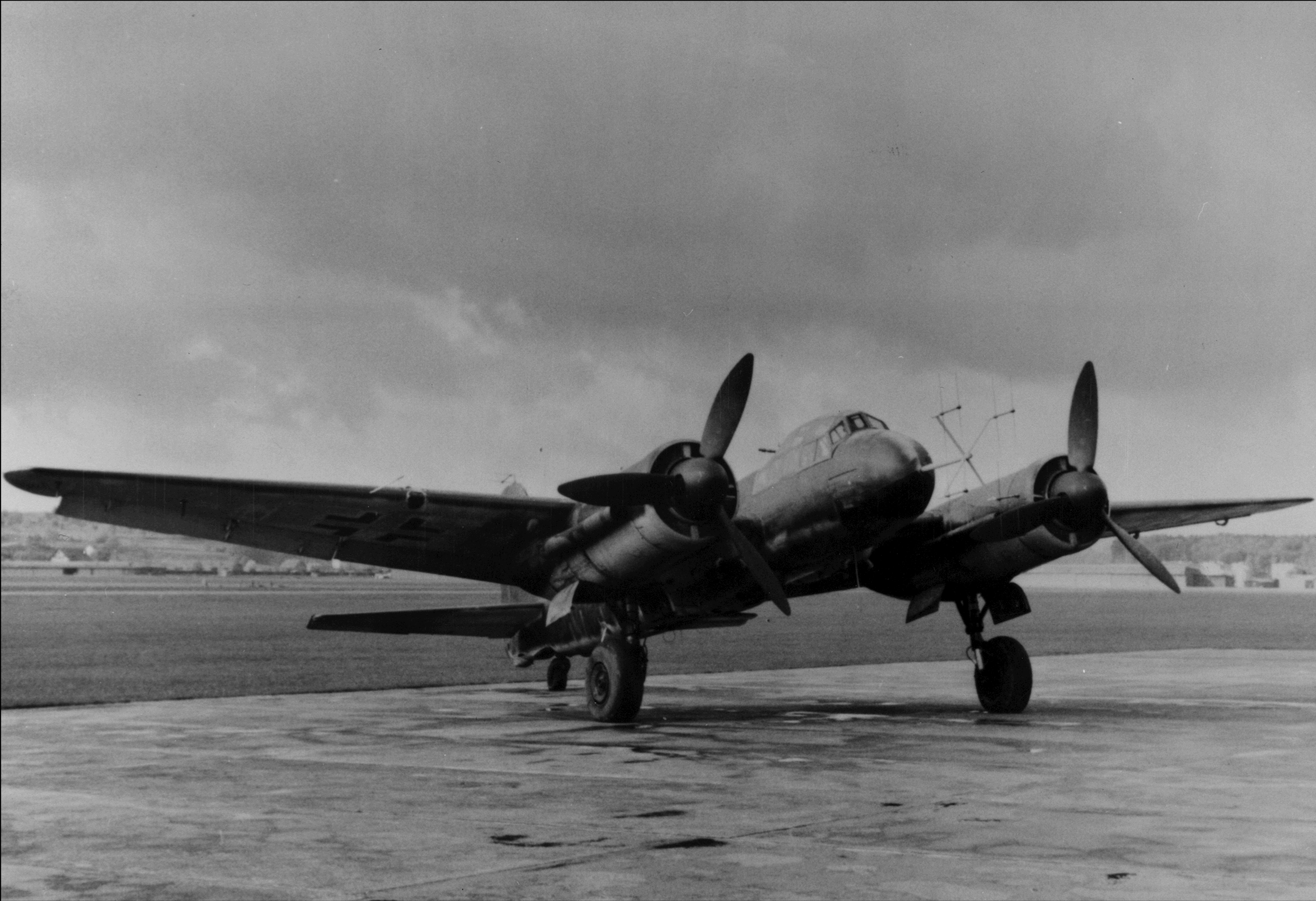
Ju 88 G-6 with FuG 218 radar in 1945

The C-6 as night fighter was typically equipped with FuG 202 Lichtenstein BC low-UHF band airborne intercept radar, using the complex 32-dipole Matratze antennas. The first four C-6 night fighters were tested in early 1942 by NJG 2. The trials were successful and the aircraft was ordered into production. In October 1943, many C-6s were upgraded with new radar systems. The first new radar equipment was the FuG 212 Lichtenstein C-1. After the UHF-band Lichtenstein radars had been compromised to the Allies in the late spring of 1943, the next development in German AI radar was the VHF-band FuG 220 Lichtenstein SN-2, discarding the 32-dipole Matratze antennae for the much larger eight-dipole Hirschgeweih (stag's antlers) aerials, required for the longer wavelength SN-2 system.

Many Ju 88C's had their Bola gondolas modified to hold up to two forward firing 20 mm (0.787 in) cannons. Several C-6 night fighters were equipped with two "Schräge-Musik" upward-firing 20 mm (0.79 in) cannons in trial fittings, and from mid 1943 onward, there was an official field modification kit available for this arrangement.

A small number of the C-series day fighters had their new solid-metal noses specially painted to resemble the bomber A-series' "beetle's eye" faceted clear view nose glazing, in an attempt to deceive Allied pilots into thinking the fighters were actually bombers; the unusual "camouflage" attempt did result initially in a number of Allied aerial losses.

==== Ju 88R ====
Ju 88 R-1 night fighter captured by British forces at Copenhagen-Kastrup airfield, May 1945

The Ju 88R series night fighters were basically versions of the Ju 88 C-6, powered by unitized BMW 801 radial engines. The R-1 had 1,147 kW (1,539 hp) BMW 801L engines and the R-2 had 1,250 kW (1,677 hp) BMW 801 G-2 engines.

One of the first aircraft from the R-1 series that went into service (Werknummer 360 043) was involved in one of the most significant defections from the Luftwaffe. On 9 May 1943, this night fighter (D5+EV), which was stationed with 10./NJG 3 in Aalborg Denmark, flew to the RAF Station at Dyce (now Aberdeen Airport) with its entire crew and complete electronic equipment on board. The fact that Spitfire Vb fighters No.165 (Ceylon) Squadron escorted it towards the end of its flight could indicate that its arrival had been expected. It was immediately transferred to Farnborough Airfield, received RAF markings and serial number PJ876, and was tested in great detail. The preserved aircraft is on exhibit at the Royal Air Force Museum Midlands, as one of the first two intact Ju 88s in aviation museums. The Luftwaffe learned of this defection only the following month when members of the crew, pilot Oberleutnant Heinrich Schmitt (son of the former secretary to the ministry for foreign affairs (1923–1929) Gustav Stresemann) and Oberfeldwebel Paul Rosenberger made broadcasts on British radio. (Note: See present-day photo of this aircraft in the "Survivors" section.) The third crew-member, Erich Kantwill, refused to co-operate with the British and was treated as a regular prisoner of war.

==== Ju 88G ====
All previous night fighter versions of the Ju 88 used a modified A-series fuselage. The G-series fuselage was purpose-built for the special needs of a night fighter, with the A-series' Bola ventral under-nose defensive gun position omitted for lower aerodynamic drag and less weight, and adding the enlarged squared-off vertical fin/rudder tail unit of the Ju 188. G-1 aircraft possessed more powerful armament and like the earlier R-1, used a pair of 1,250 kW (1,677 hp) BMW 801 radial engines, the G-1 using the later BMW 801G-2 version. Electronic equipment consisted of the then-standard FuG 220 Lichtenstein SN-2 90 MHz VHF radar using eight-dipole Hirschgeweih antennas, which could include fitment of the borderline-SHF-band FuG 350 Naxos radar detector with its receiving antenna housed in a teardrop-shaped streamlined fairing above the canopy, or FuG 227 Flensburg radar detector homing devices that had their own trio of twin-dipole antennae: one on each wing leading edge and one under the tail. One Ju 88G-1 of 7. Staffel/NJG 2 was flown by mistake to RAF Woodbridge in July 1944, giving the Royal Air Force its first chance to check out the VHF-band Lichtenstein SN-2 radar and Flensburg radar detector gear.

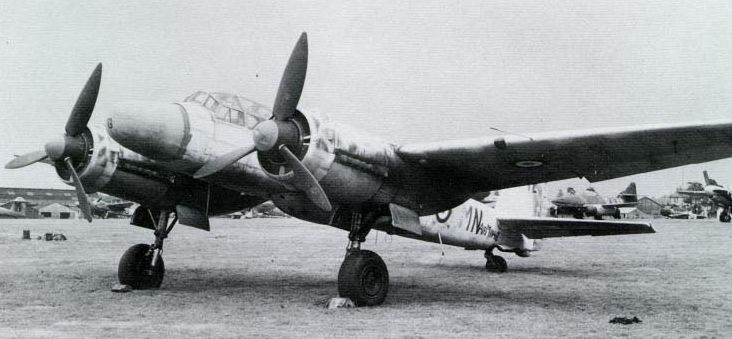
A British-captured Ju 88 G-6 night fighter equipped with the FuG 240 Berlin cavity magnetron radar, with smooth radome nose

G-6 versions were equipped with 1,287 kW (1,726 hp) Jumo 213A inverted V-12 engines (using the same redesigned annular radiator cores as the Ju 188s powered by them), enlarged fuel tanks and often one or two 20 mm (0.79 in) MG 151/20 cannons in a Schräge Musik ("Jazz Music", i.e. slanted) installation. These guns were pointed obliquely upwards and forwards from the upper fuselage – usually at an angle of 70°.

Some of the final G-series models received updates to the engines, using a pair of high-altitude Jumo 213E inverted V-12s with the same revised annular radiator design as the 213As already used, or to the radar, using the mid-VHF band FuG 218 Neptun AI radar with either the standardized Hirschgeweih aerials with shorter dipoles to suit the higher frequencies used, or more rarely the advanced Morgenstern 90° crossed-element, six-dipole Yagi-form antenna. Only a very few Ju 88G-6 night fighters were ever fitted with the semi-experimental FuG 240 Berlin N-1 cavity magnetron based, 3 GHz-band (centimetric) radar, whose dish antenna was housed in a smoothly contoured radome on the G-6's nose. Only about 15 of the Berlin systems were completed before V-E Day.

Many Luftwaffe night fighter aces, such as Helmut Lent (110 victories) and Heinrich Prinz zu Sayn-Wittgenstein (87 victories) flew Ju 88s during their careers.

== Operational history ==
=== Initial operations and the invasion of Poland ===
The first Ju 88s to be used in squadron service were assigned to the unit Erprobungskommando 88 (Ekdo 88), which was responsible for testing new bomber designs and their crews under hostile conditions. On 26 September 1939, the unit's first operation was conducted, during which multiple Ju 88s flew over the Firth of Forth with the intention of bombing any British warships present. It is generally believed that no meaningful damage was inflicted to any British vessel during this raid, although future attacks to this area by the type were often more successful.

A total of 12 Ju 88s saw action during the invasion of Poland. Ekdo 88 selected 12 aircraft and their crews and attached them to 1./Kampfgeschwader 25. As a result of its small operational numbers, the type made no meaningful impact.

=== Battle of Norway ===
The Luftwaffe committed II./Kampfgeschwader 30 to the campaign under X. Fliegerkorps for Operation Weserübung. The unit was equipped with Ju 88s and engaged Allied shipping as its main target. On 9 April 1940, Ju 88s of KG 30 dive-bombed, in cooperation with high-level bombing Heinkel He 111s of KG 26, and helped damage the battleship HMS Rodney and sink the destroyer HMS Gurkha. However, the unit lost four Ju 88s in the action, the highest single loss of the aircraft in combat throughout the campaign.

=== Battle of France ===
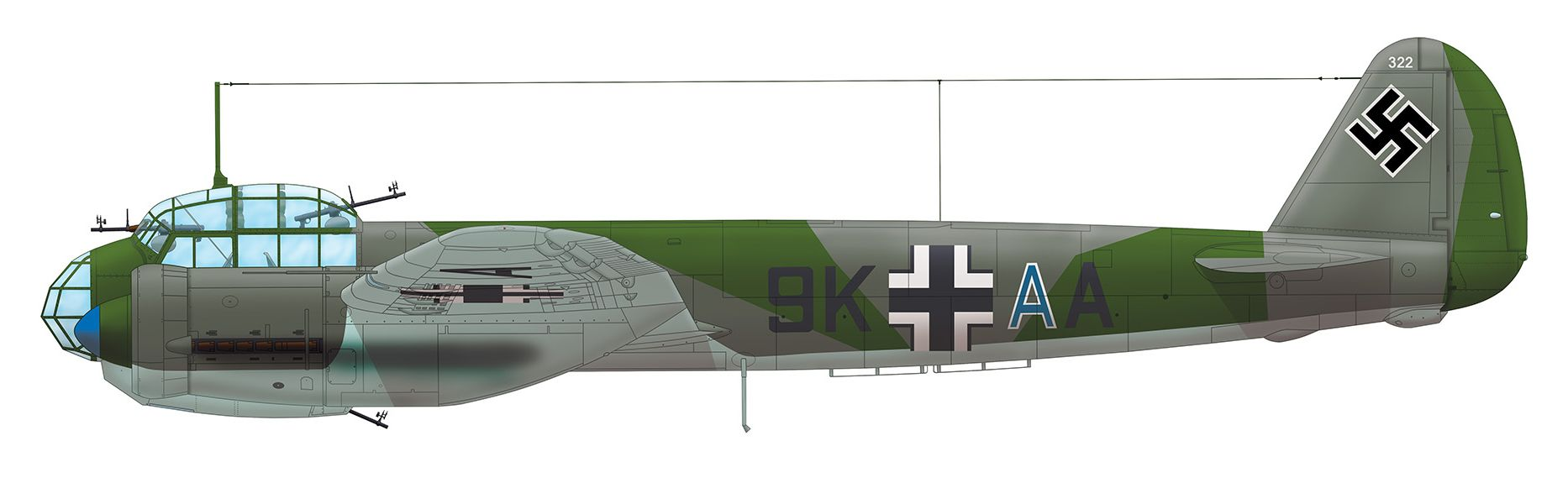
Junkers Ju 88A-1 of the Stab/KG 51, June 1940

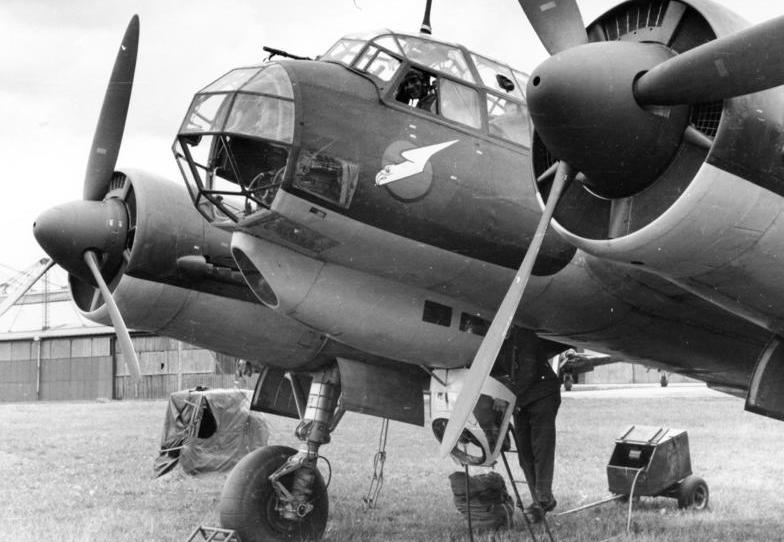
Ju 88A, circa 1940

The Luftwaffe's order of battle for the French campaign reveals all but one of the Luftwaffe's Fliegerkorps (I. Fliegerkorps) contained Ju 88s in the combat role. The mixed bomber units, including the Ju 88, of Kampfgeschwader 51 (under the command of Luftflotte 3) helped claim between 233 and 248 Allied aircraft on the ground between 10 and 13 May 1940. The Ju 88 was particularly effective at dive-bombing. Between 13 and 24 May, I. and II./KG 54 flew 174 attack against rail systems, paralysing French logistics and mobility. On 17 June 1940, Ju 88s (mainly from Kampfgeschwader 30) destroyed a "10,000 tonne ship", the 16,243 grt ocean liner RMS Lancastria, off Saint-Nazaire, killing some 5,800 Allied personnel. Despite this, the rival He 111 was more heavily used for offensive bombing during this campaign.

Some 133 Ju 88s were pressed into the Blitzkrieg, but very high combat losses (as well as accidents) forced a quick withdrawal from action to re-train crews to fly this very high-performance aircraft. Some crews were reported to be more scared of the Ju 88 than the enemy, and requested a transfer to an He 111 unit. By this time, major performance deficiencies in the A-1 led to an all-out effort in a major design rework. The outcome was a longer, 20.08 m (65.9 ft) wingspan, from extended rounded wing tips that had already been standardised on the A-4 version, that was deemed needed for all A-1s; thus the A-5 was born. Surviving A-1s were modified as quickly as possible, with new wings to A-5 specifications.

=== Battle of Britain ===
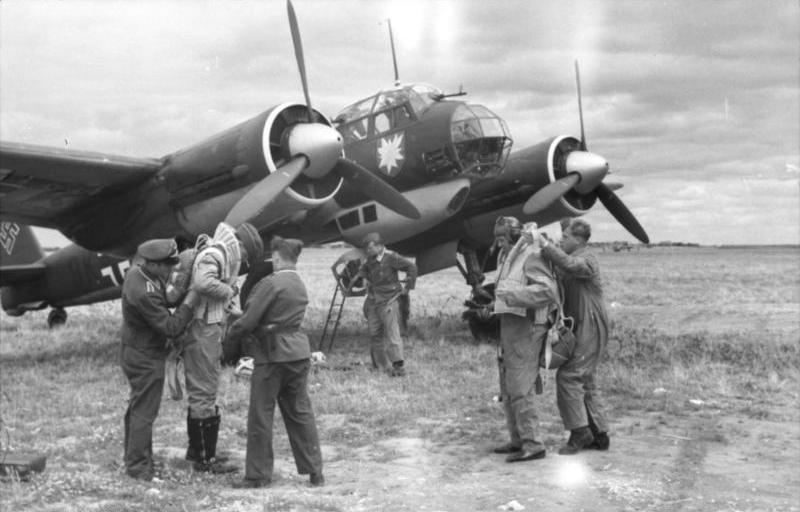
A Junkers 88 A-1, of Kampfgeschwader 51 with its crew (1940)

By August 1940, A-1s and A-5s were reaching operational units just as the Battle of Britain was intensifying. On 11 August 1940, the first major bombing raid upon Britain by the Ju 88 was conducted against Weymouth and Portland. Subsequent attacks that month were flown against targets in Portsmouth, Farnborough, Driffield, Brize Norton, and Middle Wallop. On 7 September 1940, the Luftwaffe redirected its attacks towards London. From October 1940, as a result of the high loss rate, daytime bombing of Britain ceased in favour of night time bombing.

The Battle of Britain proved to be very costly to the Luftwaffe. The Ju 88's higher speed did not prevent losses from exceeding those of its Dornier Do 17 and Heinkel He 111 stablemates despite being deployed in smaller numbers than either. During 1940, Ju 88 losses over Britain totalled 303 aircraft between July and October 1940. Do 17 and He 111 losses for the same period were 132 and 252 machines destroyed, respectively. Amongst the factors responsible for the high loss rate were the poor coordination between Luftwaffe fighter and bomber aircraft and the austere conditions of the French airfields from where these bombers operated.

Of all the losses suffered by the Ju 88 at that time, however, a number were due to the tricky behaviour of the aircraft, especially when compared with the proven He 111, and to the crews' lack of experience on the type – many having converted to the Ju 88 only shortly before. Of the 39 losses recorded for July 1940, for example, only 20 were due to enemy action. The others being written off in training accidents, crashes, or malfunctions over mainland Europe. A series of field modifications were made to make the Ju 88 less vulnerable, including the replacement of the single MG 15 rear machine gun by a twin-barreled MG 81Z machine gun and the fitting of additional cockpit armour.

One incident involved ground fighting between the crew of an A-1 and soldiers from the London Irish Rifles during the Battle of Graveney Marsh on 27 September 1940. It was the last action between British and foreign military forces on British mainland soil.

Between January 1943 and April 1944, a smaller scale reprisal bombing campaign was waged using Ju 88s against the British mainland. On 21 January, almost every available bomber on the Western Front was dispatched to attack London. Attacks continued against various British cities for months but the number of aircraft in each raid dwindled. In late April, in an attempt to disrupt preparations for the D-Day landings, Ju 88s were redirected towards British ports along the southern coast; these were largely ineffective and thus were abandoned within the space of a month. By August 1944, the Luftwaffe's Ju 88 force had been heavily diminished.

=== The Balkans and Greece ===
The Ju 88 was used by VIII Fliegerkorps during the German invasion of Yugoslavia in April 1941. That same month, the type was also used during the German invasion of Greece (Operation Marita); at the start of the conflict, several Ju 88s dropped mines along the approaches to the harbour of Piraeus and bombed ships in the vicinity, which took the port out of action for weeks.

During May 1941, the German invasion of Crete commenced. On 22 May, numerous Ju 88s, along with various other bomber aircraft of the Luftwaffe, attacked vessels belonging to the Royal Navy's Mediterranean Fleet, reportedly sinking one cruiser, damaging two other cruisers and a single battleship in the process. Following the Italian surrender in 1943, Ju 88s were also used during the German invasion of the Italian-held Dodecanese Islands, which took place between September and November 1943.

=== Eastern Front ===
In advance of Operation Barbarossa, a combination of Ju 86s and Ju 88s were used to systematically map out the western portion of the Soviet Union as part of Germany's pre-invasion preparations. By the summer of 1941, most of the units equipped with the Dornier Do 17 were upgrading to the Ju 88. With a few exceptions, the majority of the Luftwaffe's bomber units were flying the He 111 and Ju 88 by this point.

On 22 June 1941, the invasion commenced; the Ju 88 units met with instant success, attacking numerous enemy airfields and positions at low level and causing enormous losses for little damage in return. 3./Kampfgeschwader 3 attacked Pinsk airfield in the morning of 22 June 1941. It caught, and claimed destroyed, 60 Soviet bombers on the ground. The 39 SBAP Regiment of the 10 Division SAD actually lost 43 Tupolev SBa and five Petlyakov Pe-2s. Ju 88s from Kampfgeschwader 51 destroyed over 100 aircraft after dispatching 80 Ju 88s to hit airfields. In general the Soviet aircraft were not dispersed and the Luftwaffe found them easy targets. A report from the Soviet 23rd Tank Division of the 12th Armoured Corps described a low-level attack by Ju 88s on 22 June, resulting in the loss of 40 tanks. However, the Ju 88s were to suffer steady attritional losses. At 0415 on 22 June 1941, III./KG 51 attacked the airfield at Kurovitsa. Despite destroying 34 Polikarpov I-153s, the Ju 88s were intercepted by 66 ShAP I-153s. Six Ju 88s were shot down before the German fighter escort dealt with the threat. By the end of the first day of the campaign, Ju 88 losses amounted to 23 destroyed.

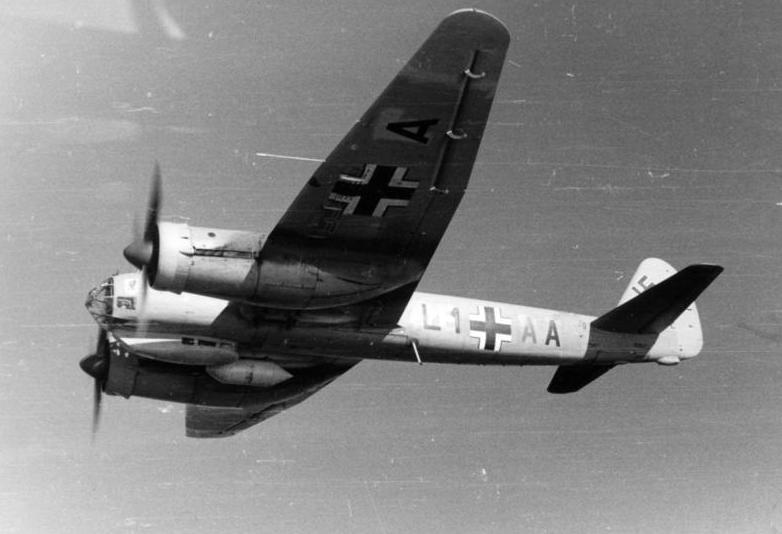
Ju 88A of LG 1 over the Eastern Front, 25 September 1941

Immediately following the initial attacks, it was decided to send Ju 88s to bomb Moscow. Over a hundred bombers were dispatched on these missions every night during the opening portion of the campaign. The air campaign against the Soviet capital was not sustainable in light of other demands, tapering down to only seven aircraft per night by December 1941.

Due to the lack of sufficient numbers of Ju 87 Stukas, the Ju 88 was quickly employed in the direct ground support role. This decision resulted in severe losses being incurred from ground fire. Kampfgeschwader 1, Kampfgeschwader 76 and Kampfgeschwader 77 reported the loss of 18 Ju 88s over enemy territory on 23 June. KG 76 and KG 77 reported the loss of a further four Ju 88s, of which 12 were 100% destroyed.

In the north, the VVS North-Western Front lost 465 aircraft on the ground, 148 of them bombers, to the Ju 88s of KG 1. A further 33 were damaged. Out of a total of 1,720 aircraft deployed by the VVS Northern Front on 22 June, it lost 890 and a further 187 suffered battle damage in eight days. The Ju 88s units helped virtually destroy Soviet airpower in the northern sector. Again, the Ju 88 demonstrated its dive-bombing capability. Along with He 111s from KG 55, Ju 88s from KG 51 and 54 destroyed some 220 trucks and 40 tanks on 1 July, which helped repulse the Soviet South Western Front's offensive. The Ju 88s destroyed most rail links during interdiction missions in the area, allowing Panzergruppe 1 to maintain the pace of its advance.

Ju 88 units operating over the Baltic states during the battle for Estonia inflicted severe losses on Soviet shipping, with the same dive-bombing tactics used over Norway, France and Britain. KGr 806 sank the Soviet destroyer Karl Marx on 8 August 1941 in Loksa Bay Tallinn. On 28 August the Ju 88s had more success when KG 77 and KGr 806 sank the 2,026 grt steamer Vironia, the 2,317 grt Lucerne, the 1,423 grt Atis Kronvalds and the ice breaker Krišjānis Valdemārs (2,250 grt). The rest of the Soviet "fleet", were forced to change course. This took them through a heavily mined area. As a result, 21 Soviet warships, including five destroyers, struck mines and sank. On 29 August, the Ju 88s accounted for the transport ships Vtoraya Pyatiletka (3,974 grt), Kalpaks (2,190 grt) and Leningradsovet (1,270 grt) sunk. In addition, the ships Ivan Papanin, Saule, Kazakhstan and the Serp i Molot were damaged. Some 5,000 Soviet soldiers were lost.

Another key use of the Ju 88 was against the Arctic convoys bringing supplies to the Soviets via the ports of Murmansk and Arkhangelsk. Effective attacks against these convoys did not commence until late March 1942; convoys after this point would often lose ships to air-launched torpedoes. Convoy PQ 17 reportedly lost 23 out of 34 ships, which was partially attributed to attacks by Ju 88s. Later convoys with heavier escorts, which sometimes included aircraft carriers, proved to be far more costly to attack.

=== The Mediterranean ===
During 1940, the first Ju 88s arrived in Sicily. Further units equipped with the type would be transferred to the theatre during 1941 and 1942. In December 1941, it was decided to launch an aerial campaign against the Allied-held island of Malta. During the Siege of Malta, Ju 88s sought out and attacked Allied shipping across the Mediterranean and also undertook bombing missions against the island itself. The port area was specifically targeted, as well as any supply ships spotted, in an attempt to deprive the population of key resources; the island's airfields were also attacked, successfully destroying numerous Supermarine Spitfires on the ground during one such attack in May 1942. Ju 88s were often escorted by Messerschmitt Bf 110 heavy fighters to deter the Allied interception efforts.

By March 1943, Ju 88 operations in the Mediterranean had become largely confined to night time bombing missions against ground targets. In response to Allied attacks upon the Sardinian airfields around this time, German aircraft were withdrawn to Sicily and the Italian mainland. By the time of the Allied invasion of Sicily in July 1943, only a single unit equipped with Ju 88s was still stationed on the island.

=== North Africa ===
Ju 88s were used in the North African campaign, where they flew operations in support of the Axis forces in North Africa.

=== Italian Campaign ===
Prior to the Allied landings at Reggio and Salerno in early September 1943, there were a total of five Ju 88 units stationed in Italy. Missions were flown against the arriving troops, helping to bring about a temporary stalemate. A large-scale operation occurred on 2 December 1943 when 105 Ju 88 A-4s, armed with bombs and motobomba circling torpedoes, attacked the Allied-held port of Bari, Italy. The attacking force achieved complete surprise and sunk over 20 Allied ships in the overcrowded harbour, including the U.S. Liberty ship John Harvey, which was carrying mustard gas. About 1,000 people were killed and another 1,000 wounded; many fatalities and injuries were as a result of the release of mustard gas. The attacking force lost one aircraft; the Allies had not assigned any fighters to guard Bari as they thought the Luftwaffe incapable of striking in this strength at this stage of the war. The port was completely closed for three weeks from the damage of the raid, and only resumed full operation in February 1944.

In December 1943, many of the Luftwaffe's remaining Ju 88-equipped units in Italy were transferred away to other fronts.

=== Finnish Air Force ===
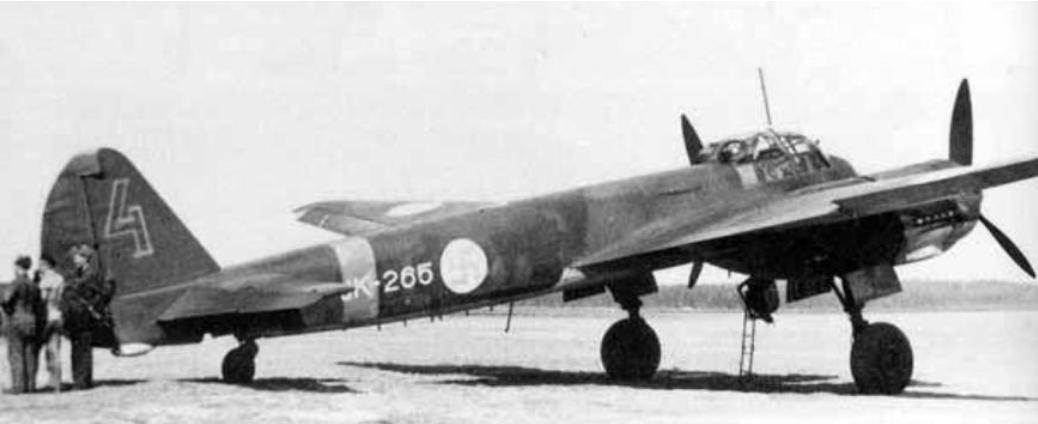
Finnish Air Force Junkers Ju 88 A-4. The FAF aircraft code for Ju 88 was JK.

In April 1943, as Finland was fighting its Continuation War against the USSR, the Finnish Air Force bought 24 Ju 88s from Germany. The aircraft were used to equip No. 44 Sqn, which had previously operated Bristol Blenheims, but these were instead transferred to No. 42 Sqn. Due to the complexity of the Ju 88, the FAF spent most of 1943 training crews on the aircraft, and conducted only a handful of bombing missions. The most notable was a raid on the Lehto partisan village on 20 August 1943 (in which the whole squadron participated), and a raid on the Lavansaari air field (leaving seven Ju 88 damaged from forced landings in inclement weather). In the summer of 1943, the Finns noted stress damage on the wings. This had occurred when the aircraft were used in dive bombing. Restrictions followed: the dive brakes were removed and it was only allowed to dive at a 45-degree angle (compared to 60–80 degrees previously). In this way, they tried to spare the aircraft from unnecessary wear.

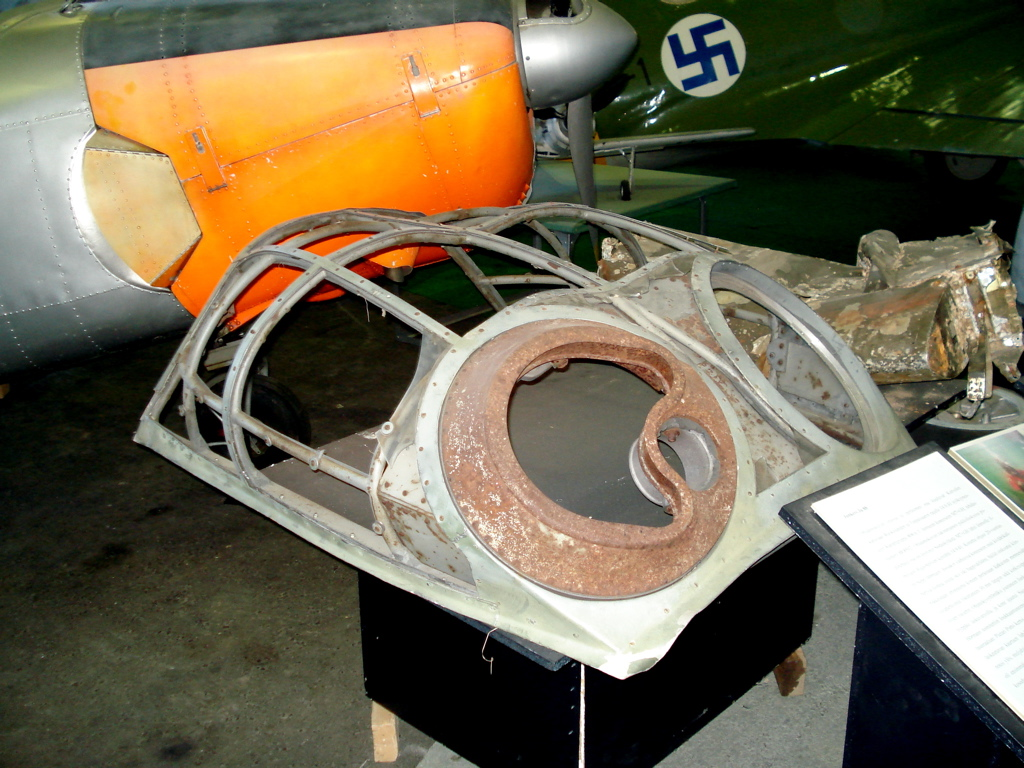
Ju 88 cockpit hood preserved at the Finnish Aviation Museum in Vantaa

One of the more remarkable missions was a bombing raid on 9 March 1944 against Soviet Long Range Aviation bases near Leningrad, when the Finnish aircraft, including Ju 88s, followed Soviet bombers returning from a night raid on Tallinn, catching the Soviets unprepared and destroying many Soviet bombers and their fuel reserves, and a raid against the aerosledge base at Petsnajoki on 22 March 1944. The whole bomber regiment took part in the defence against the Soviets during the fourth strategic offensive. All aircraft flew several missions per day, at both day and night, when the weather permitted.

No. 44 Sqn was subordinated Lentoryhmä Sarko during the Lapland War (now against Germany), and the Ju 88s were used both for reconnaissance and bombing. The targets were mostly vehicle columns. Reconnaissance flights were also made over northern Norway. The last war mission was flown on 4 April 1945.

After the wars, Finland was prohibited from using bomber aircraft with internal bomb stores. Consequently, the Finnish Ju 88s were used for training until 1948. The aircraft were then scrapped over the following years. No Finnish Ju 88s have survived, but an engine is on display at the Central Finland Aviation Museum, and the frame structure of a German Ju 88 cockpit hood is preserved at the Finnish Aviation Museum in Vantaa.

== Variants ==
=== Ju 88A ===
Main bomber type with Jumo 211 engines.

Ju 88 A-0
Pre-production aircraft.
Ju 88 A-1
Initial production variant. 895 kW (1,200 hp) Jumo 211B-1 engines
Ju 88 A-2
Jumo 211 G-1 engines.
Ju 88 A-3
Conversion trainer. Dual controls and throttles, various instruments duplicated.

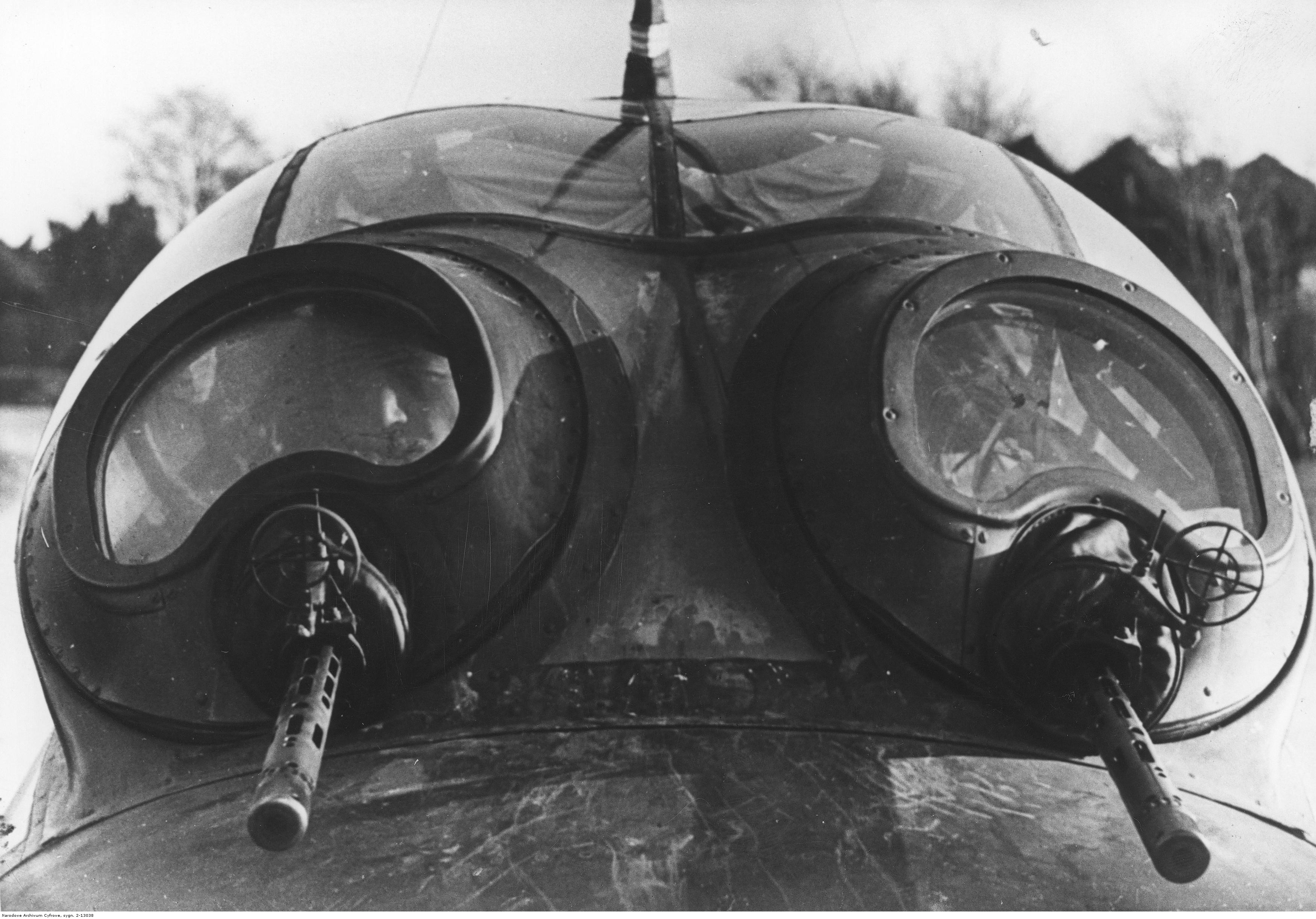
The rear-facing defensive armament of the Ju 88 A-4.

Ju 88 A-4
Improved variant. Longer wingspan, due to redesigned wingtips. Stronger defensive armament. Power provided by Jumo 211 J-1 or J-2 engines producing 1,050 kW (1,410 hp), driving wooden bladed propellers. Reinforced undercarriage. Provision for four external bomb racks.
Ju 88 A-5.
This version actually predates the A-4. Earlier models of Ju 88 upgraded with longer wings and other equipment. Jumo 211B-1, G-1 or H-1 engines all rated at 890 kW (1,200 hp) for take-off.
Ju 88 A-6
Was equipped with a balloon cable fender. A counterweight was mounted in the rear fuselage. Extremely vulnerable to fighter interception, most reverted to the normal A-5 version, fender and counterweight removed.
Ju 88 A-7
Dual control trainer based on the A-5
Ju 88 A-8
This version had balloon cable cutting capabilities, crew reduced to three, Jumo 211F-1 engines
Ju 88 A-11
Factory built tropical version
Ju 88 A-12
Dual control trainer. Ventral gondola, dive brakes and all armament removed.
Ju 88 A-13
Low level assault version. Dive brakes and bomb sight removed. Additional armor for crew, engines and fuel tanks. Armament consisted of bombs and up to 16 MG 17 machine guns housed in gun pods.
Ju 88 A-14
An improved A-4 version, more armor for the crew, Kuto-Nase balloon cable cutters, bomb sight removed.
Ju 88 A-15
Based on the A-4, it featured an enlarged wooden bomb bay, capable of holding 3 tons of bombs. Ventral gondola removed, only two defensive MGs. It was rejected as the bomb bay "bulge" caused too much drag and a thus a reduction in speed.
Ju 88 A-16
Dual control trainer based on the A-14
Ju 88 A-17
Dedicated torpedo bomber, no ventral gondola. One PVC torpedo rack under each wing replaced the two bomb racks. A long housing on the starboard side of the nose contained the torpedo aiming mechanisms. Crew of three.

=== Ju 88B ===
Prototype with all-new fully glazed "stepless" crew compartment nose, developed into Junkers Ju 188.

Ju 88 B-0
10 pre-production aircraft with "stepless" fully glazed nose.

=== Ju 88C ===
Zerstörer, fighter-bomber and night fighter, based on A-series, but with sheet metal nose.

Ju 88 C-1
Heavy fighter, 20 converted from A-1, Jumo 211 engines
Ju 88 C-2
Heavy fighter, 20 converted from A-5
Ju 88 C-3
Heavy fighter with BMW 801A engines, one built
Ju 88 C-4
Heavy fighter, reconnaissance variant, based on A-5. 60 built and 60 converted from A-5
Ju 88 C-5
Heavy fighter, like C-4 but with BMW 801 engines, up to four converted
Ju 88 C-6
Heavy fighter and Night fighter, based on A-4, Jumo 211J engines with 1,044 kW (1,401 hp), 900 built

=== Ju 88D ===
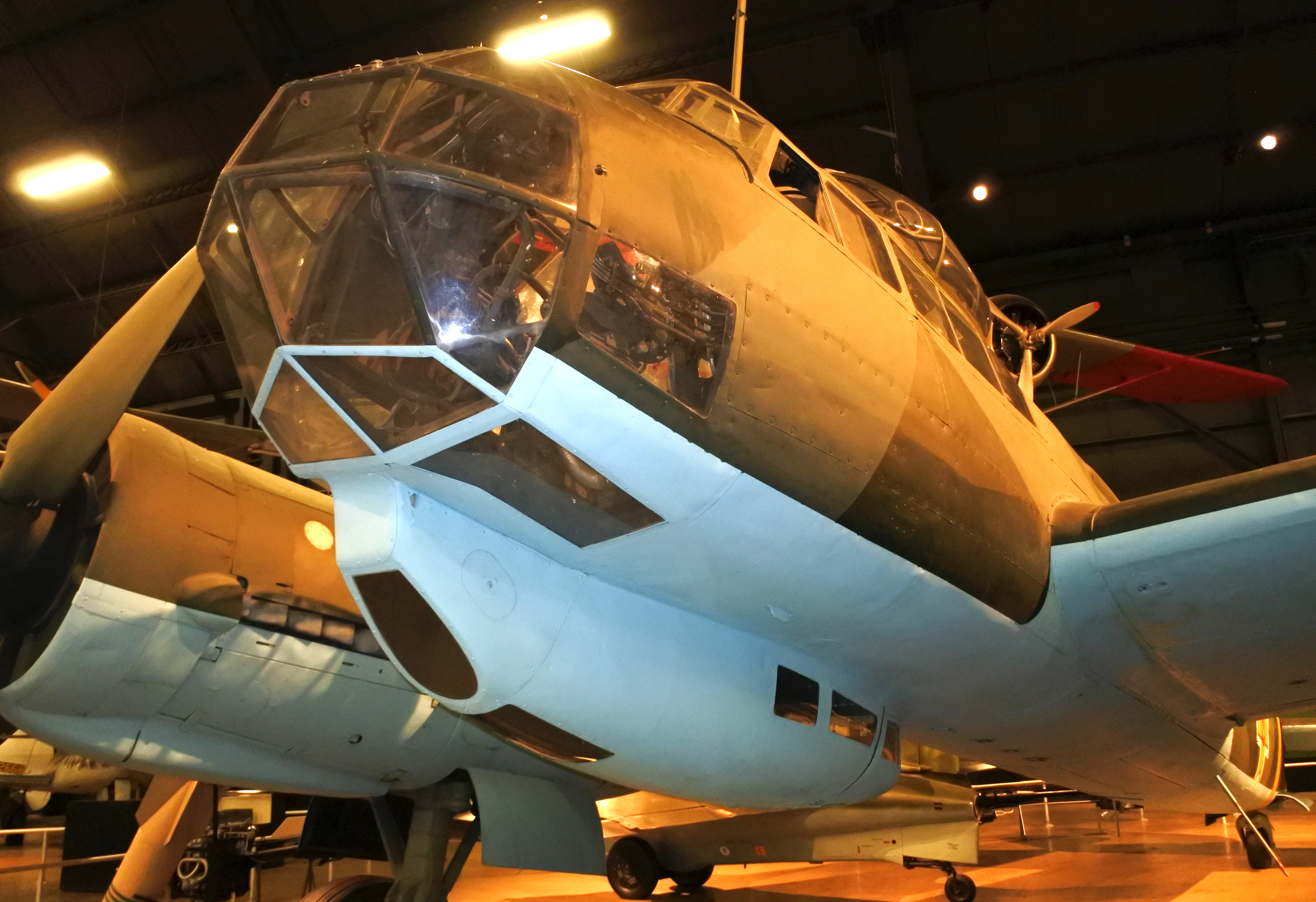
Ju 88D (tropicalized) at the National Museum of the United States Air Force

Long-range photo-reconnaissance variants, based on the Ju 88 A-4/A-5.

Ju 88 D-1
Long-range photo-reconnaissance variant based on Ju 88 A-4.
Ju 88 D-2
Long-range photo-reconnaissance variant based on Ju 88 A-5.
Ju 88 D-3
Tropicalized D-1.
Ju 88 D-4
Tropicalized D-2.
Ju 88 D-5
as D-1 but with VDM metal propellers instead of Junkers wooden propellers

=== Ju 88G ===
Night fighter, new fuselage with A-series' ventral Bola (Bodenlafette) gondola omitted, tail section from Ju 188, aerodynamically improved conformal gun pod for a quartet of forward-firing 20 mm (0.787 in) calibre, MG 151/20 autocannons below the former bomb bay.

Ju 88 G-1
BMW 801 radial engines with 1,250 kW (1,677 hp), FuG 220 Lichtenstein SN-2 radar
Ju 88 G-6
Junkers Jumo 213A inverted V12 engines with 1,287 kW (1,726 hp), used either FuG 220 Lichtenstein SN-2 90 MHz or FuG 218 Neptun 158/187 MHz frequency radar, either with the usual Hirschgeweih eight-dipole aerial setup or experimentally with the more aerodynamic Morgernstern tripled crossed-dipole aerials. Some very-late-war aircraft equipped with experimental FuG 240 Berlin cavity magnetron based 3 GHz radar, with dish antenna in bulbous solid nose. Optional with Schräge Musik upward firing guns with two 20 or 30 mm (0.787 or 1.181 in) guns.
Ju 88 G-7
Identical to G-6, but with Jumo 213E high-altitude engines, planned for use with FuG 218/220 with Morgenstern array or FuG 240. The G-7 was also to be installed with wings from the Junkers Ju 188.
Ju 88G-3, 4 and 8 not produced.

=== Ju 88H ===
Long-range photo-reconnaissance, fighter variants, based on the stretched Ju 88G-series fuselage.

Ju 88 H-1
Long-range maritime reconnaissance variant, equipped with a FuG 200 Hohentwiel radar and a trio of remotely controlled cameras in the aft fuselage.
Ju 88 H-2
Fighter variant intended to attack Allied long range convoy escort aircraft armed with six Forward firing MG 151/20.
Ju 88 H-3
Ultra-long-range maritime reconnaissance variant similar to H-1.
Ju 88 H-4
Destroyer variant.

=== Ju 88P ===
Anti-tank and bomber destroyer variant with single Bordkanone series 75 mm (2.953 in), 50 mm (1.969 in), or twin 37 mm (1.457 in) calibre cannon in conformal ventral fuselage gun pod mount, which mandated removal of the Bola gondola under the cockpit section, conversion of A-series bomber. Produced in small series only, they were perceived as a failure for both anti-tank and anti-bomber use.

Ju 88 P-1
Heavy-gun variant fitted with single 75 mm (2.953 in) Bordkanone BK 7,5 cannon in ventral gun pod. Appeared in mid-1942 in small numbers.
Ju 88 P-2
Heavy-gun variant with twin 37 mm (1.457 in) Bordkanone BK 37 cannon in ventral gun pod.
Ju 88 P-3
Heavy-gun variant with twin 37 mm (1.457 in) Bordkanone BK 37 cannon in ventral gun pod, and additional armor.
Ju 88 P-4
Heavy-gun variant with single 50 mm (1.969 in) Bordkanone BK 5 cannon in ventral gun pod. There were 32 built.
Ju 88 P-5
Proposed heavy-gun variant with single 88 mm (3.465 in), none known to have ever been built.

=== Ju 88R ===
C-series night fighters with BMW 801 engines.

=== Ju 88S ===
High-speed bomber series based on Ju 88 A-4 but with ventral Bola gondola omitted, smoothly glazed nose with radial-ribbed supports instead of the "beetle's eye" of the A-version, and GM-1 nitrous-oxide boost, fastest of all variants.

Ju 88 S-0
Fitted with two BMW 801 G-2 engines, single 13 mm (0.512 in) dorsal gun and 14 SD65 65 kg (143 lb) bombs.
Ju 88 S-1
Fitted with two BMW 801 G-2 engines, the GM-1 boost system and could carry two SD1000 1,000 kg (2,200 lb) bombs externally.
Ju 88 S-2
Fitted with two turbocharged BMW 801J engines, wooden bomb bay extension as used on the Ju 88 A-15.
Ju 88 S-3
Fitted with two 1,671 kW (2,241 hp) Jumo 213A engines and GM-1 boost system.

=== Ju 88T ===
Three-seat photo-reconnaissance version of S-series.

Ju 88 T-1
Based on the Ju 88 S-1 but with bomb bays fitted for extra fuel or GM-1 tanks.
Ju 88 T-3
Based on the Ju 88 S-3.

== Operators ==
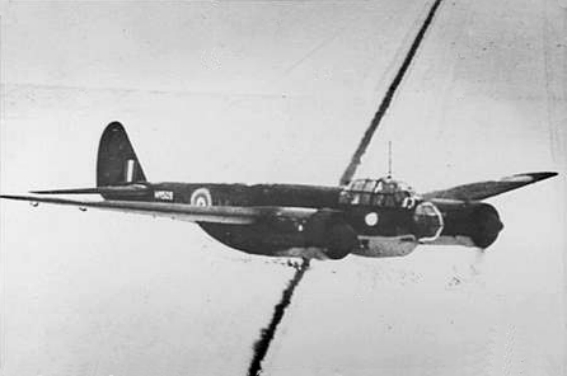
A captured Junkers Ju 88A-5, RAF serial HM509, of No. 1426 (Enemy Aircraft Circus) Flight based at Collyweston, Northamptonshire, in flight

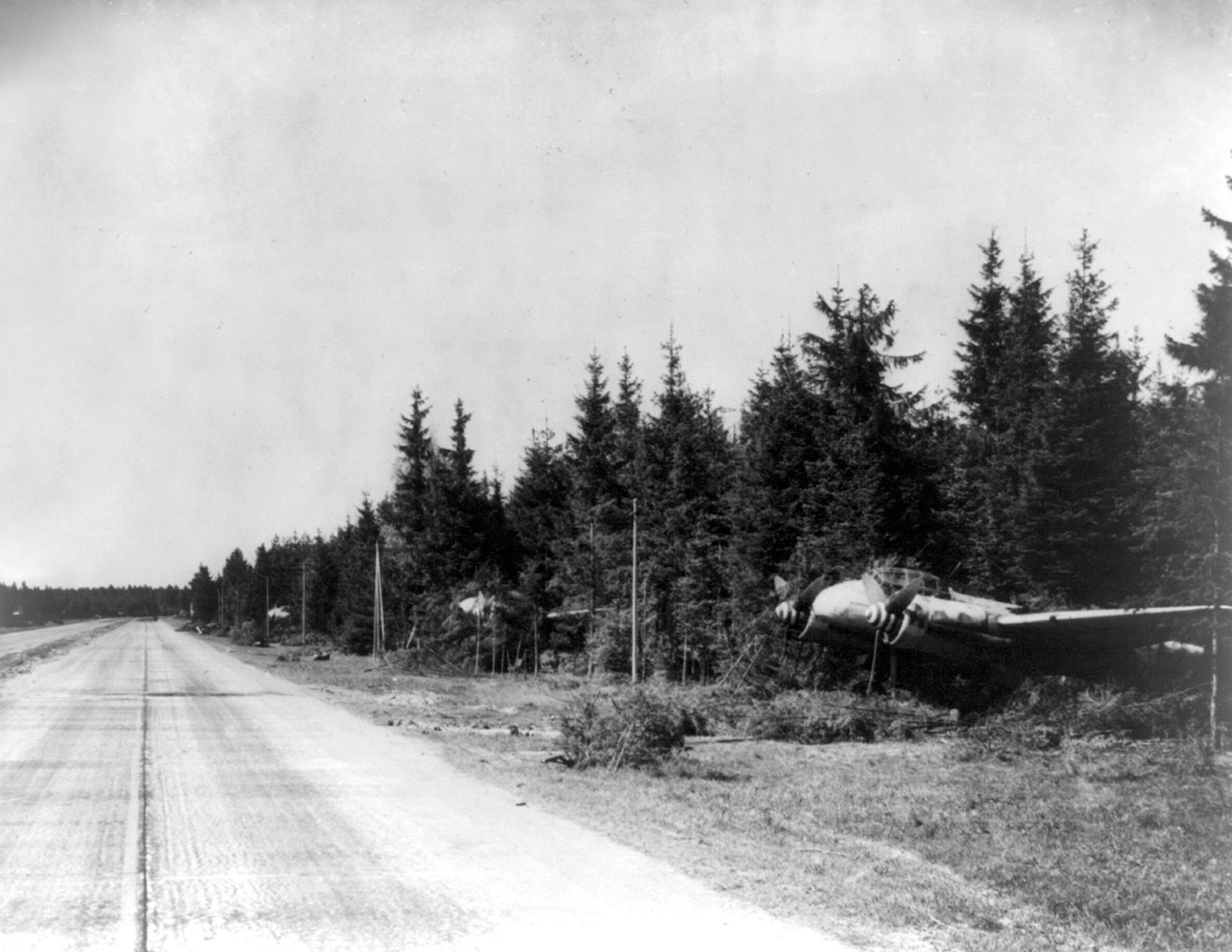
Ju 88 heavy fighters parked beside a Reichsautobahn used as a highway strip, early 1945

Finland

- Finnish Air Force received 24 Ju 88 A-4 aircraft.
  - No. 44 Squadron

France

- French Air Force operated aircraft captured in Toulouse repair depot and other captured by the RAF and USAAF handed over to the French.
- French Navy (Postwar)

Germany

- Luftwaffe

Hungary

- Royal Hungarian Air Force

Italy

- Regia Aeronautica

Romania

- Royal Romanian Air Force

United Kingdom

- Royal Air Force
  - No. 1426 Flight RAF operated at least five captured aircraft.

Soviet Union

- Soviet Air Force bought three Ju 88A-1 for evaluation in 1940 and operated captured aircraft.

Spanish State

- Spanish Air Force bought ten aircraft and put into service another 15 interned during the war.

== Surviving aircraft ==
Only two complete aircraft exist. They were both flown into British hands by defecting crews during the war.

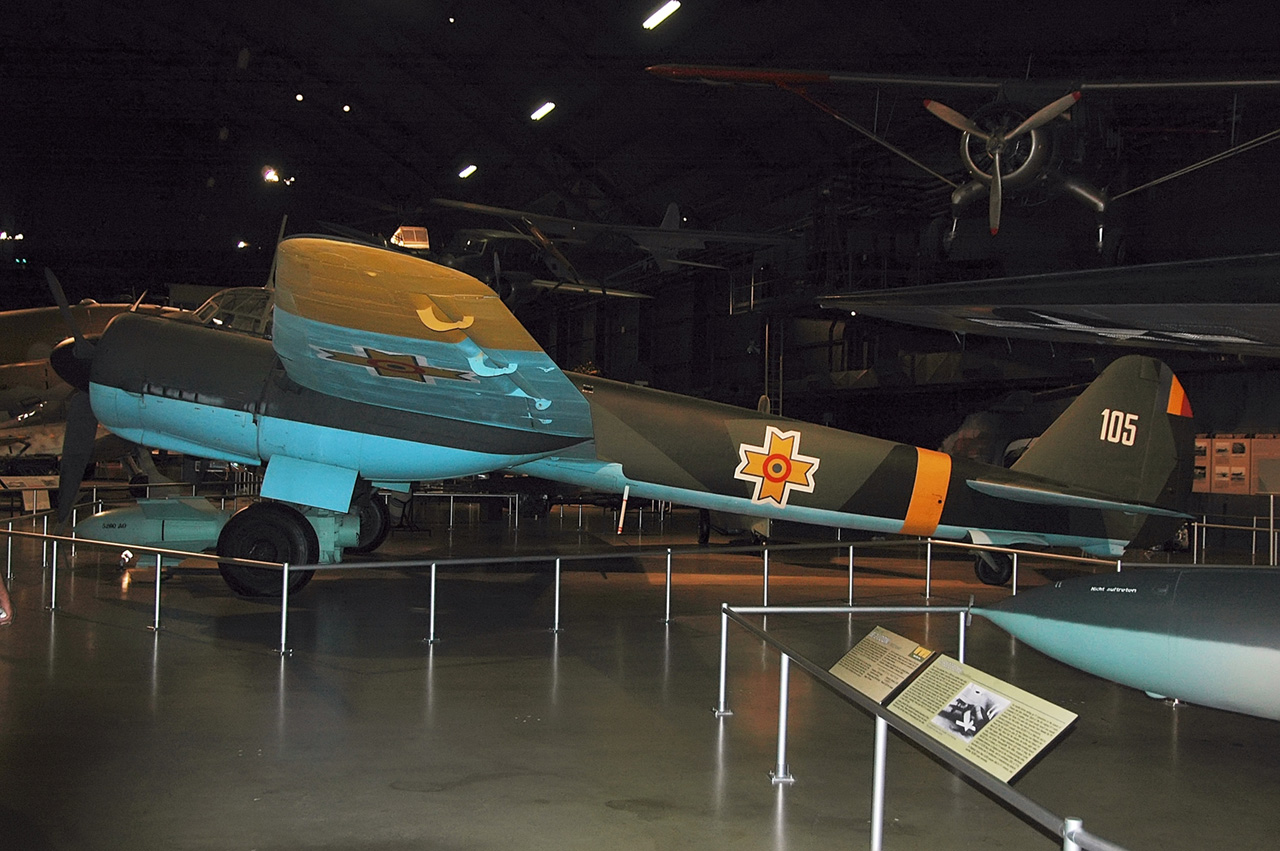
Junkers Ju 88 D-1/Trop, Baksheesh, USAF Museum (Pictured in 2007)

Ju 88 D-1/Trop, Werk Nr. 430650
This is a long-range, photographic reconnaissance aircraft that was in the service of the Royal Romanian Air Force. On 22 July 1943, it was flown from Mariupol, Ukraine, to Cyprus by a Romanian pilot who wanted to defect to the Allied side. His original intention had been to fly to Syria, but strong winds blew him off-course. Four RAF Hawker Hurricanes intercepted the aircraft and escorted it to a landing at Limassol.

Given the name Baksheesh, it was allocated the RAF serial number HK959 and test–flown in Egypt. However, by this point in the war, the RAF had already acquired three Ju 88s in flying condition (Note: EE205, captured in July 1941. Werk Nr. 6073 (HM509), captured in November 1941 and Werk Nr. 360043 (PJ876), surrendered in May 1943) and Baksheesh was handed over to the United States Army Air Forces. The aircraft was fitted with additional external fuel tanks, then flown across Africa to Nigeria, across the South Atlantic to Brazil, via Ascension Island. Then finally across the Caribbean to Florida.

In the US, it was registered as FE-1598 and used for examination and test flying from 1943 to 1944 at Wright Field. In 1946, the aircraft was placed in storage at Davis-Monthan Air Force Base in Arizona. It was shipped to the US Air Force Museum on 6 January 1960. It was previously painted in spurious Luftwaffe markings, appropriately of a German WW II Aufklärungsgruppe (reconnaissance group) while on unrestored, outdoor display; however it is presently finished in its original-style Romanian military insignia and is on protected indoor display in the World War II Gallery at the National Museum of the United States Air Force in Dayton, Ohio.

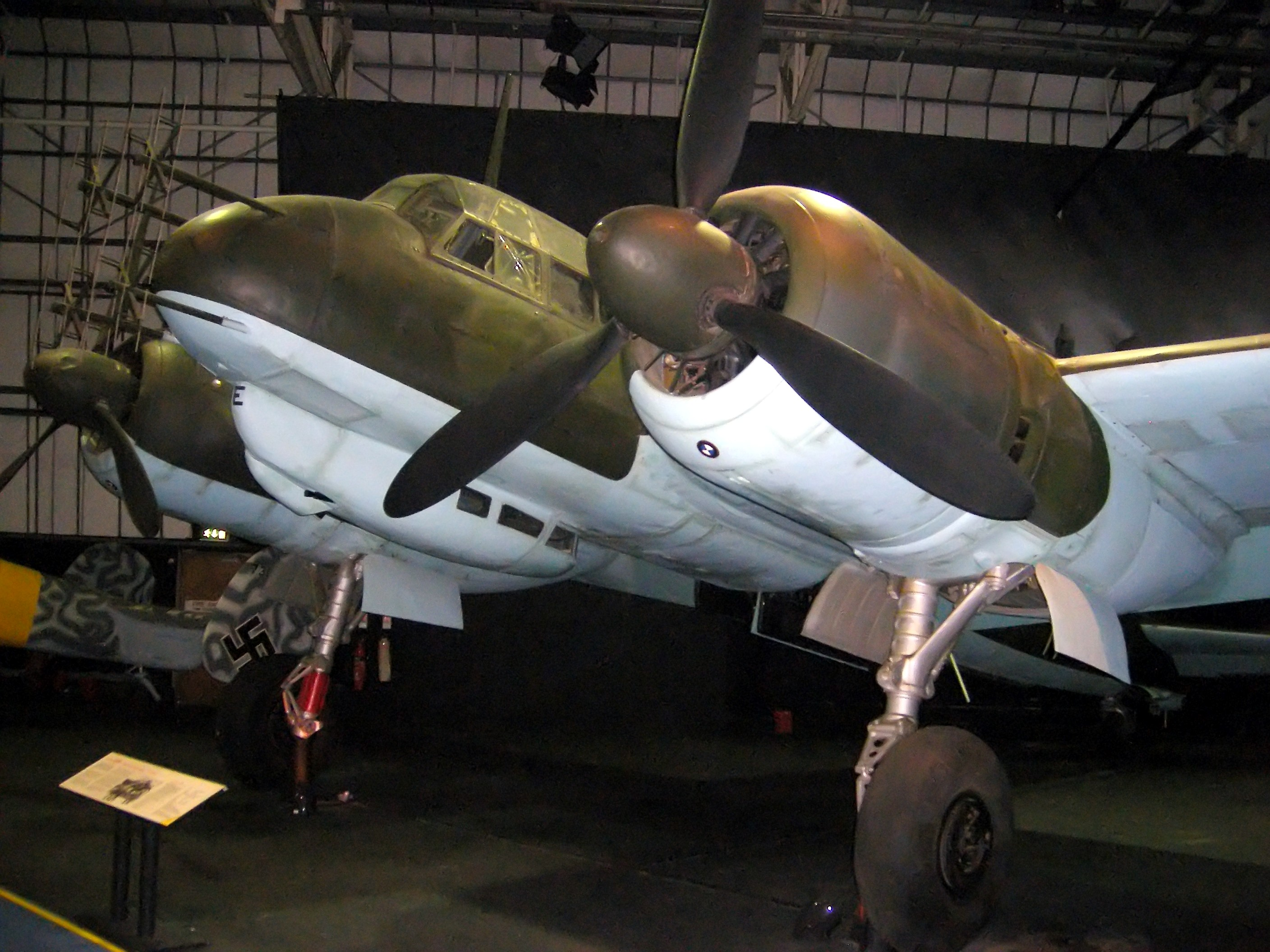
Ju 88 R-1, Werk Nr. 360043, RAF Museum (Pictured in 2007)

Ju 88 R-1, Werk Nr. 360043
This aircraft is thought to have been built in mid–1942 as a model A bomber, before being converted to a model R–1 fighter in early 1943. It was flown to Scotland by its defecting crew in May 1943; two of the three crew on board (who may have been British agents) had taken the decision to defect after being ordered to shoot down a civilian BOAC Mosquito courier flight from Sweden to the UK.

The aircraft took off from Aalborg, Denmark on 9 May, landing at Kristiansand, Norway for refuelling, it then took off again, supposedly for a mission over the Skagerrak. The defecting crew instead flew west to Scotland while holding the third crewmember at gunpoint. The aircraft was detected by British radar as it approached the Scottish coast and two Spitfires from 165 Squadron were scrambled. They intercepted 360043 one mile inland, whereupon the Ju 88 lowered its undercarriage, dipped its wings and dropped flares, signalling the crew's intent to surrender. The Spitfires escorted 360043 to RAF Dyce, where it received slight damage from the airfield's anti-aircraft guns while attempting to land. The Spitfire pilots (an American and a Canadian) were mentioned in dispatches for taking the risk not to open fire on the Ju 88 upon interception.
The surrender of this aircraft was of great intelligence value at the time, as it was fitted with the latest UHF-band FuG 202 Liechtenstein BC A.I radar, for which a new form of the Window radar interference method, set up for UHF-band airborne radar jamming, was developed soon afterwards. The Ju 88R-1 was operated by the RAF's No. 1426 (Enemy Aircraft) Flight and evaluated in depth by various British groups, including the Royal Aircraft Establishment and the Fighter Interception Unit. It was used to assist in teaching enemy aircraft recognition skills prior to the D-Day landings, and was last flown in May 1945. In September 1954 and again in September 1955, it was displayed on Horseguards Parade for Battle of Britain week. The aircraft was restored in 1975 and fitted with a replica of its characteristic Matratze 32-dipole radar antenna array, as all its radar equipment had been removed during the war. In August 1978, it was moved to the Royal Air Force Museum Midlands, its present home.

Several reasonably intact aircraft have been recovered from underwater and remote land crash sites in recent years; some of these aircraft are under restoration for static display. Notable examples include:

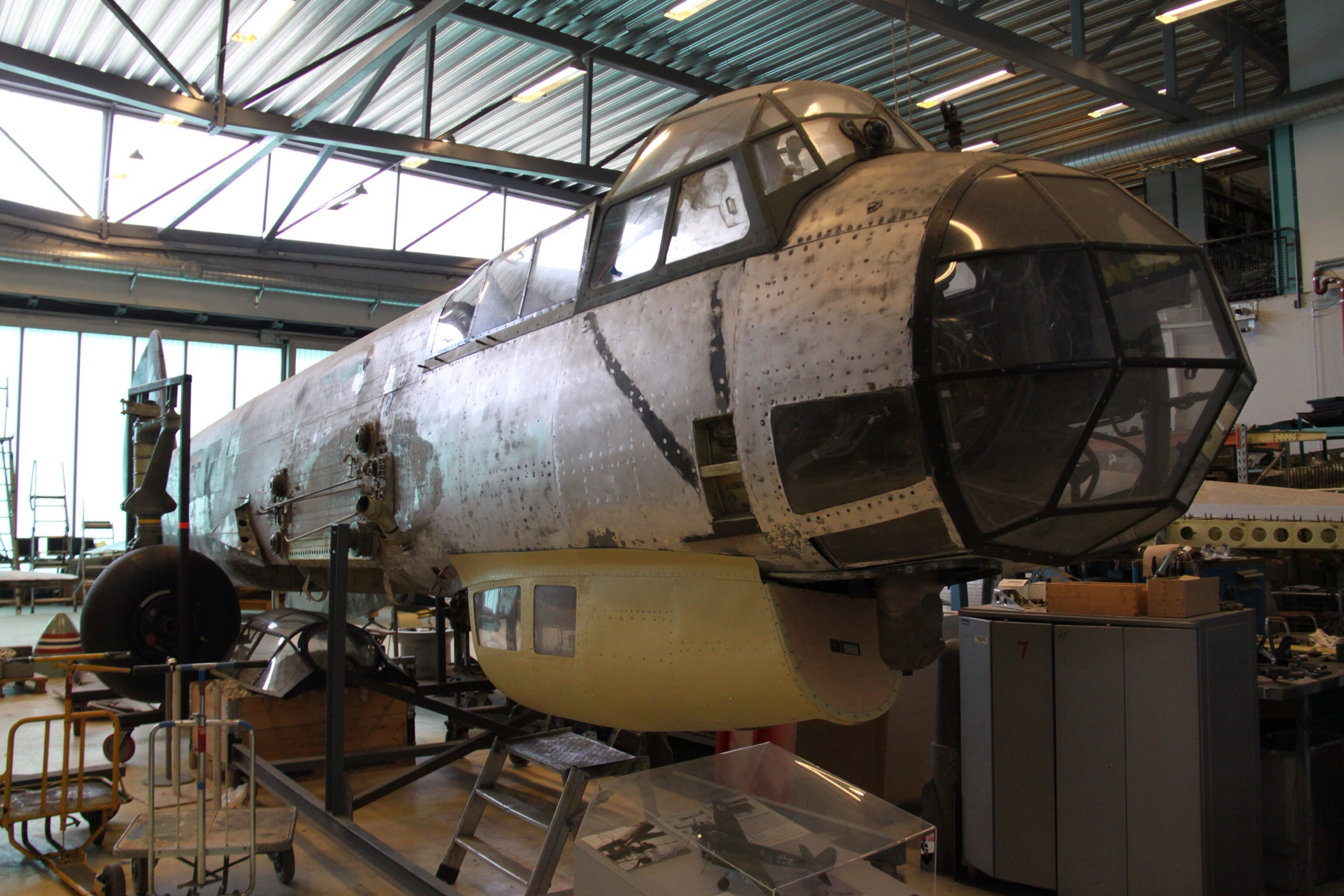
Werk Nr. 0880119 undergoing restoration at Gardermoen, Norway, August 2013

Ju 88 A-1, Werk Nr. 0880119, with Geschwaderkennung of U4+TK
This aircraft is the subject of a long-term restoration project at the Norwegian Armed Forces Aircraft Collection at Gardermoen, near Oslo, Norway. It first flew in January 1940 and served with 2.Staffel/Kampfgeschwader 30, under the call sign U4+TK (with the two-character Geschwaderkennung designation of U4 not recorded as ever having been used by KG 30 - that wing usually used the 4D wing code) during Operation Weserübung, the German invasion of Norway. In April 1940, it was operating from the frozen surface of the Jonsvatnet, a lake near Trondheim in Norway. The lake was being used as an improvised airfield by the Germans, who were conducting operations against Allied naval ships and against the towns of Namsos and Narvik. Towards the end of April, warmer weather made the frozen lake surface unusable for flying operations and a number of aircraft were abandoned on the ice, sinking into the lake when it melted completely. The Ju 88 was recovered in late 2003, in an operation that also saw the recovery of a Heinkel He 111 H-2 6N+NH (Wk Nr 2320) and the tail section of a second Ju 88.

Ju 88 A-4, Werk Nr. 0881478 4D+AM (ex-Stammkennzeichen of BH+QQ)
This aircraft, formerly of 4.Staffel/Kampfgeschwader 30 is displayed at the Norwegian Aviation Museum at Bodø Airport. On 13 April 1942, it was returning from an attack on Soviet ships when it ran out of fuel. The crew bailed out in the vicinity of Snefjord but the aircraft continued its flight and, remarkably, was left comparatively intact after crash-landing on a hillside at Garddevarre in Finnmark in the far north of Norway. It remained there until recovered by the Norsk Luftfartsmuseum in 1988.

Ju 88 A-5, Werk Nr. 0886146 with Stammkennzeichen of CV+VP
This aircraft is held at the Deutsches Technikmuseum near Berlin. It was delivered to the Luftwaffe in June 1940 and assigned to the bomber unit Kampfgeschwader 54, who flew it in the Battle of Britain and during the German invasion of the Soviet Union.

In June 1942, it was serving with a training unit, Kampffliegerschule 3 based on the German Baltic coast. On the night of 29 June, it was stolen by two German personnel who intended to fly to Britain and defect to the Allied side. The attempt failed and the aircraft came down in Kilsfjord, a fjord near Kragerø, Norway. One man drowned but the other, Willi Voss, was rescued by Norwegian civilians. However, he was subsequently captured, returned to Germany and executed in January 1943, even though some accounts claim Voss was forced by the other man to fly at gunpoint. The aircraft was recovered in August 2000. Restoration work was carried out in Norway between 2000 and 2004; it was moved to Germany in August 2006.

== Specifications (Ju 88 A-4) ==
Junkers Ju 88 A-4

Data from The warplanes of the Third Reich.

General characteristics

- Crew: 4 (pilot, bombardier/front gunner, radio operator/rear gunner, navigator/ventral gunner)
- Length: 14.4 m (47 ft 3 in)
- Wingspan: 20 m (65 ft 7 in)
- Height: 4.8 m (15 ft 9 in)
- Wing area: 54.5 m^{2} (587 sq ft)
- Empty weight: 9,860 kg (21,737 lb)
- Gross weight: 12,105 kg (26,686 lb)
- Max takeoff weight: 14,000 kg (30,865 lb)
- Powerplant: 2 × Junkers Jumo 211J-1 or 211J-2 V-12 liquid-cooled inverted piston engine, 1,000 kW (1,340 hp) each for take-off

1,010 kW (1,350 hp) at 250 m (820 ft)
790 kW (1,060 hp) at 5,200 m (17,000 ft)

- Propellers: 3-bladed VDM variable-pitch propeller

Performance

- Maximum speed: 470 km/h (290 mph, 250 kn) at 5,300 m (17,390 ft) and 12,500 kg (27,557 lb)
- Cruise speed: 370 km/h (230 mph, 200 kn) at 5,300 m (17,390 ft) economical cruising speed
- Range: 1,790 km (1,110 mi, 970 nmi) with 2,896 L (765 US gal; 637 imp gal)
- Ferry range: 2,730 km (1,700 mi, 1,470 nmi) with 4,028 L (1,064 US gal; 886 imp gal)
- Service ceiling: 8,200 m (26,900 ft)
- Time to altitude: 5,400 m (17,700 ft) in 23 minutes
- Wing loading: 220 kg/m^{2} (45 lb/sq ft)
- Power/mass: 0.100 hp/lb (0.164 kW/kg)

Armament

- Guns:
  - 1 × 7.92 mm MG 81J machine gun on flexible mount in front windscreen, firing forward with 1,000 rounds. (Note: This gun could be also fixed in place with a retractable forward barrel brace for strafing attacks.)
  - 1 × 7.92 mm MG 81J machine gun on flexible mount in lower fuselage nose glazing, firing forward with 1,000 rounds.
  - 2 × 7.92 mm MG 81J machine guns on flexible mount in the rear of the cockpit canopy, firing aft with 1,000 rounds each.
  - 1 × 7.92 mm MG 81Z twin machine gun on flexible mount in the rear ventral Bola position, firing aft with 1,000 rounds.
- Bombs: Up to 1,400 kg (3,100 lb) of ordnance internally in two bomb bays rated at 900 kg (2,000 lb) and 500 kg (1,100 lb) or up to 3,000 kg (6,600 lb) externally. Carrying bombs externally increased weight and drag and impaired the aircraft's performance. Carrying the maximum load usually required rocket-assisted take-off.

== See also ==
Related development

- Junkers Ju 188
- Junkers Ju 288
- Junkers Ju 388

Aircraft of comparable role, configuration, and era

- Bristol Beaufighter
- de Havilland Mosquito
- Nakajima Ki-49
- Petlyakov Pe-2
- Saab 18
- Tupolev Tu-2
- Yokosuka P1Y

Related lists

- List of aircraft of World War II
- List of bomber aircraft
- List of military aircraft of Germany
