= Neptun (radar) =

Low-to-mid-VHF band airborne intercept radar devices WWII

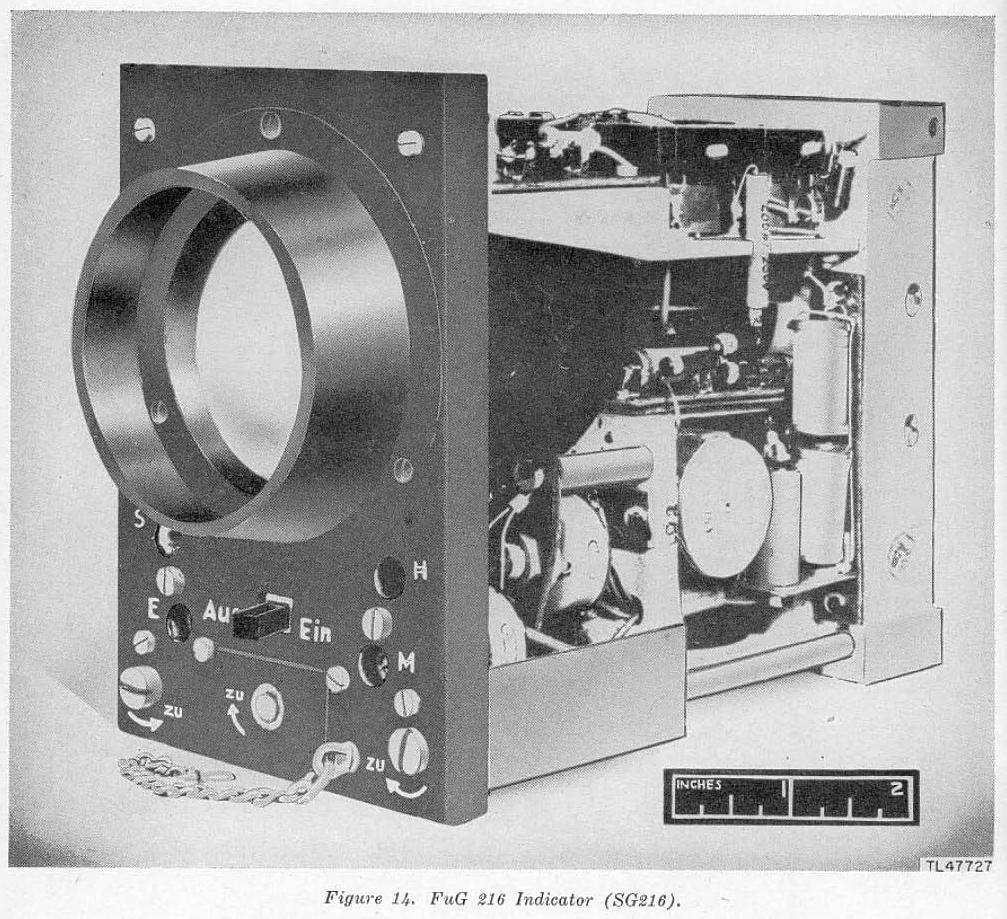
Display device of FuG 218 Neptun

Neptun (Neptune) was the code name of a series of low-to-mid-VHF band airborne intercept radar devices developed by Germany in World War II and use in several types of aircraft. They were usually combined with a "backwards warning device", indicated by the addition of the letters "V/R" Vorwärts/Rückwärts, meaning Forward/Backward). Working in the metre range, Neptun was meant as a stop-gap until scheduled SHF-band devices became available (for instance the FuG 240/E cavity magnetron-based FuG 240 Berlin AI radar).

Transceiving antennas used for Neptun on twin-engined night fighters usually used a Hirschgeweih (stag's antlers) eight-dipole array with shorter elements than the previous 90 MHz SN-2 radar had used or as an experimental fitment, the 90°-crossed twin-element set Yagi based Morgenstern single-mast-mounted array.

== Variants ==
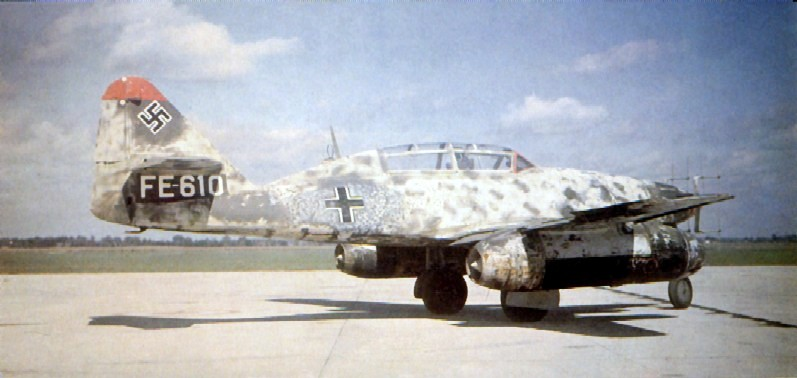
Me 262 with AI radar FuG 218 Neptun

FuG 216: Experimental series to plan the further development. Installed in Fw 190 A-6/R11 and Bf 109 G-6 The aircraft were used by NJGr 10 until March 1944, after which some machines of 6./JG 300 (Kommando Plöger) were equipped.

- Manufacturer: Flugfunkforschungsinstitut Oberpfaffenhofen (FFO, German for airborne radio research institut in Bavaria)
- R1 version (backwards warning device)

- Frequency: 182MHz
- Power: 1.0kW
- Transmitting and receiving antennas each consist of twin dipoles, mounted under and above the wings, respectively
- Single display device with distance readout

- V version (for single engined night fighters)

- Frequency: 125MHz
- Power: 1.2kW
- Range: 500 to 3,500m
- Antennas in the form of spikes or (Fw 190) as "antlers" on right and left wings

FuG 217: Installed mainly in Ju 88 G-6, only a few Bf 110 G-4, He 219 or Me 262 received the Neptun. It could be combined with the additional Elfe device to automatically measure the target distance and fire the guns at a set range.

- Manufacturer: FFO
- R2 version (backward warning device)
- J2 version (for single-engined night fighters)
- Ausführung V/R (combined night fighter and backward warning device for two-engined fighters)

- Two switchable frequencies: 158 and 187MHz
- Search angle: 120°
- Range: 440–4,370 yd (400–4,000 m)
- Spike or "antler" antennas

FuG 218: mass-produced

- Manufacturer: Siemens / FFO
- R3 version (backward warning device)
- J3 version (for single-engined night-fighters)
- V/R version (combined night fighter and backward warning device for two-engined fighters)

- Six switchable frequencies: 158 to 187MHz
- Search angle: 120°
- Range: 130–5,470 yd (120–5,000 m)
- Weight: 110 lb (50 kg)
- R3 and J3 with spike antennas and V/R with "antler" antennas.

- G/R version (combined night fighter and backward warning device for two-engined fighters)

- Only one single device built, replacing the 2kW transmitter with a 30kW transmitter. Range increased to up to 6.2 mi (10 km). This device was intended for the Dornier Do 335. "Antler" antennas.

== See also ==
- List of WW II Japanese airborne radar systems
