= FuG 240 Berlin =

Late-World-War-II German airborne interception radar system

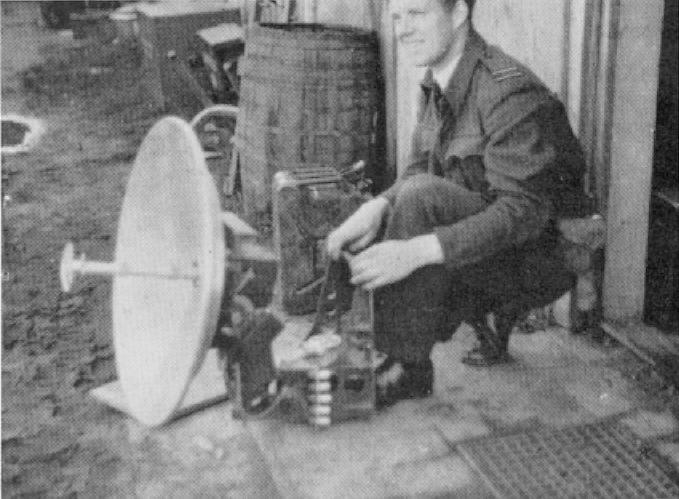
An RAF officer with a captured FuG 240 "Berlin" radar. The primary antenna is visible just to the left of the disk-shaped reflector, on the end of the mast.

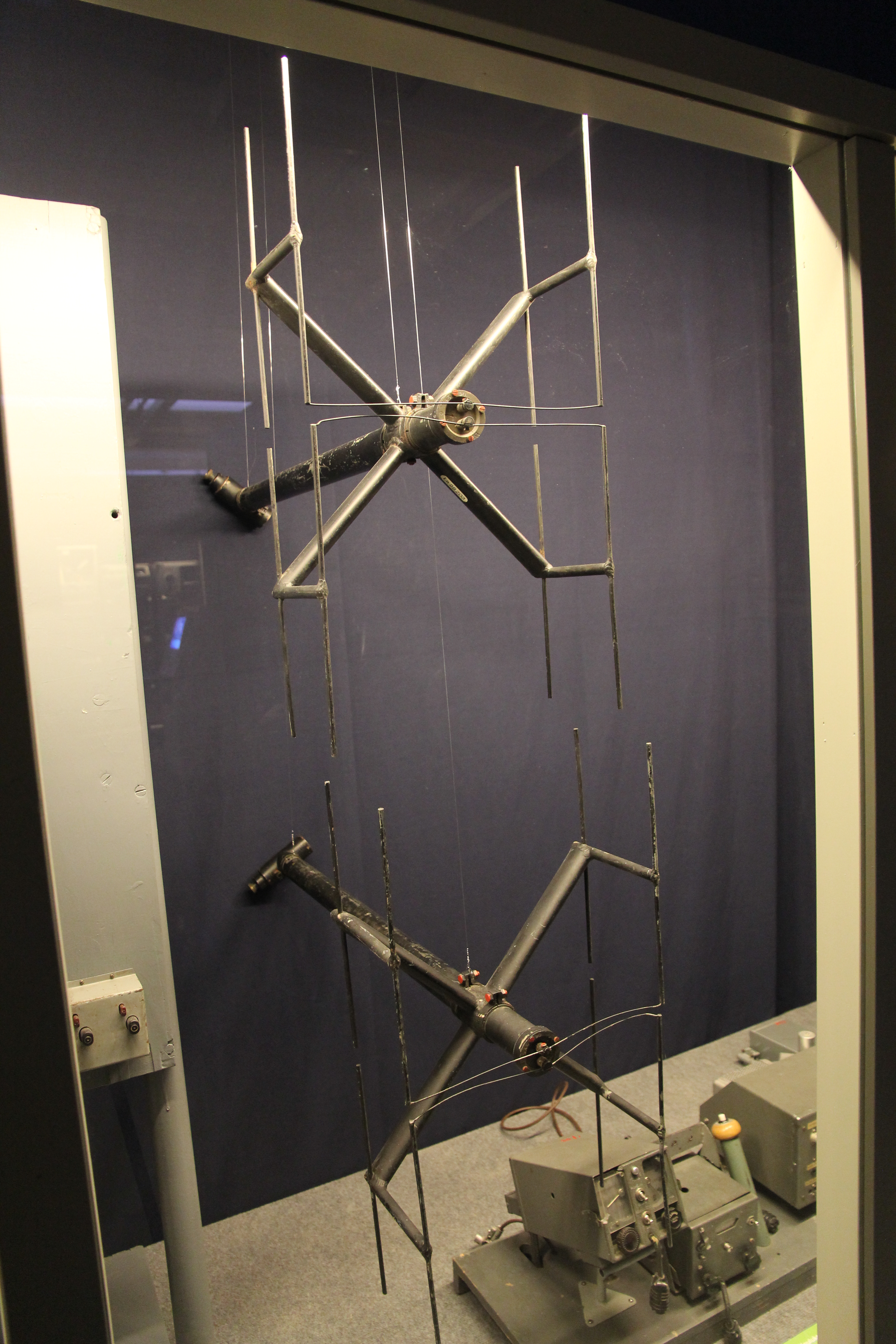
A "pair" of the "subsets" for a Lichtenstein B/C or C-1 "mattress" UHF radar antenna system.

The FuG 240 "Berlin" was an airborne interception radar system operating at the "lowest end" of the SHF radio band (at about 3.3 GHz/9.1 cm wavelength), which the German Luftwaffe introduced at the very end of World War II. It was the first German radar to be based on the cavity magnetron, which eliminated the need for the large multiple dipole-based antenna arrays seen on earlier radars, thereby greatly increasing the performance of the night fighters. Introduced by Telefunken in April 1945, only about 25 units saw service.

== Background ==
The German Luftwaffe first introduced an airborne interception radar in 1942, the FuG 202 "Lichtenstein B/C" and its direct follow-on version, the FuG 212 Lichtenstein C-1. Both units operated at 490 MHz, in the low UHF band with a wavelength of 0.61 meter. Radar antennas are sized roughly to the operational wavelength, or a fraction thereof, so the FuG 202 and 212 initially required large, 32-dipole Matratze (mattress) antenna arrays that projected in front of the aircraft and caused considerable drag - this was later reduced to a one-quarter subset of the same antenna design, centrally mounted on the aircraft's nose.

By 1943 a series of efforts and lucky intercepts had allowed the Royal Air Force to introduce jammers, which interfered with the AI radar's operation. The RAF also introduced the Serrate radar detector, which allowed British night fighters to home in on the Lichtenstein radars. Over the summer and fall of 1943, the RAF downed an impressive number of German night fighters.

The Luftwaffe responded by introducing the FuG 220 Lichtenstein SN-2 in late 1943. To avoid RAF jamming, the SN-2 operated in the low-VHF range, at 90 MHz, or 3.33 meter wavelength. The SN-2's lower frequency range required enormous eight-dipole Hirschgeweih (stag's antlers) antennas, which created so much drag that aircraft were slowed by some 50 km/hour.

The Lichtenstein SN-2 was eventually supplanted by the Neptun radar. Based on the same basic technology as the Lichtenstein, the Neptun operated on six mid-VHF frequencies between 158 and 187 MHz. with shorter dipole antennas, still in the "antler" mounting format. This unit was only a stop-gap solution.

== Rotterdam Device ==
The Royal Air Force's first Airborne Intercept radars operated in the 1.5 meter band and featured antennas similar to their later German counterparts. However, the introduction of the cavity magnetron in 1940 changed things dramatically. The magnetron efficiently generated microwaves from a device the size of a coffee tin, lowering operational wavelengths from the several-meter range to less than 10 centimeters. This reduced the antenna size to a few centimeters. Instead of simply using a smaller Yagi antenna, the system was paired with a new parabolic dish which allowed for conical scanning. The result was a small, lightweight, powerful, long range and easy to read radar.

The magnetron was initially limited to aircraft operating over the UK or sea, so that if the aircraft was lost the magnetron would not fall into German hands. However, as the war progressed several new uses for the magnetron were developed, notably ground-mapping systems like the H2S radar. These allowed the operator to obtain a crude cathode ray tube image of the ground below in any weather. This was of great use to RAF Bomber Command's efforts, and an intense debate broke out over whether to allow its use over continental Europe. In the end the decision was taken to allow H2S units in strategic operations, starting with the Pathfinder Force.

The inevitable occurred on 2 February 1943, when a Short Stirling Pathfinder was downed near Rotterdam. German forces examining the wreckage found an apparatus which they called the "Rotterdam Gerät" (Rotterdam Device). They quickly determined it to be a centimeter wavelength generator, although its exact purpose was unclear. This was revealed when a second example was captured, and the crew of the aircraft revealed it to be a mapping system. Wolfgang Martini immediately set up a team to understand the new system and devise countermeasures. This work led to the FuG 350 Naxos device, a radio receiver using a DF loop for an aircraft installation, covered with a teardrop-shaped fairing and tuned to the H2S frequencies, that was used to track the Pathfinders in flight. However, this was introduced just as the RAF was introducing the H2S Mk. III and the US their H2X radar, which operated at 3 cm (10 GHz) and thus was not seen by Naxos.

== Berlin ==
The captured magnetron was sent to Berlin and a group assembled from the German electronics industry met at the Telefunken offices to discuss it. Only days later those offices were attacked and the magnetron was destroyed. However, a second example was recovered from an aircraft taking part in that raid.

Telefunken used it as a basis for a German version of the device and an AI radar based on it. The system which Telefunken developed was similar to its British counterpart, differing largely in the display system. Given the limited number of changes, it is unclear why it took so long to get into production, over two years. Production units were not ready until the spring of 1945, and were not installed in German aircraft until April, just before the war ended.

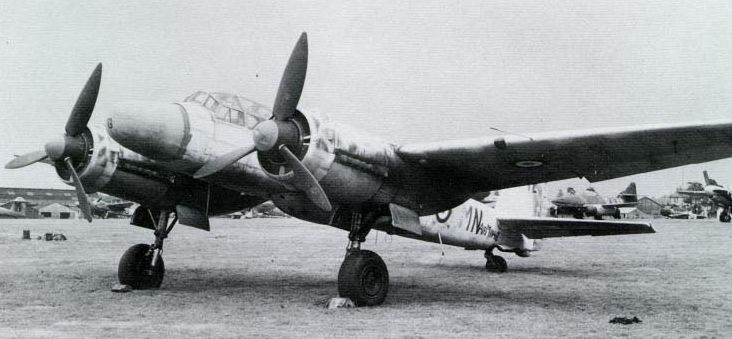
Ju 88G-6 with FuG-240 behind the plywood radome nose

The Berlin N-2 model was installed primarily in Junkers Ju 88G-6 night-fighters, behind a plywood radome. This so greatly reduced drag compared to the late-model Lichtensteins and Neptun that the fighters regained their pre-radar speeds. The power output of the N-2 radar was 15 kW, and was effective against bomber-sized targets at distances of up to 9 kilometers, or down to 0.5 kilometer, which eliminated the need for a second short-range radar system. The N-3 version used an updated display system that featured a C-scope output, which simplified the intercept.

The N-4 was a further development of the N-3; it rotated the antenna in the horizontal plane under an FuG 350 Naxos-antenna style teardrop housing atop the aircraft fuselage. The result was a 360-degree image of the sky around the aircraft that was presented on a plan position indicator (PPI). This version was later renamed the FuG 244 "Bremen", but was not approved for production.

== Technical specifications ==
- Power: 15 kW
- Search angle: +/− 55°
- Antenna diameter: 0.70 meter
- Frequency range: 3,250–3,330 MHz (~10 cm)
- Range: 0.5–9.0 kilometer
