= Lichtenstein radar =

German airborne radar in World War II

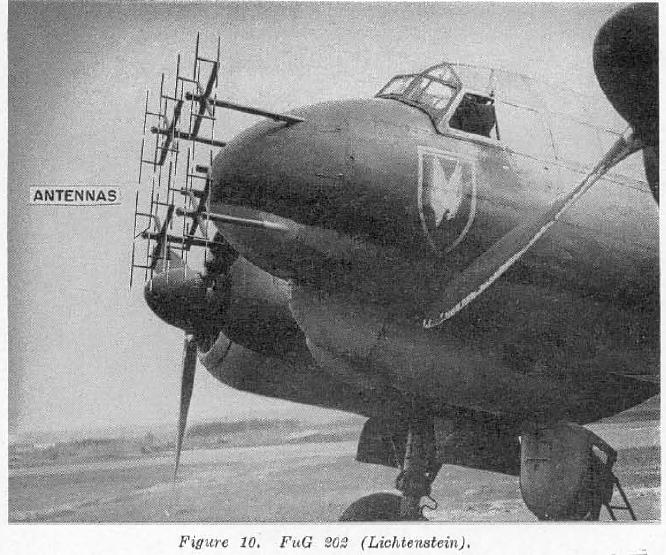
A Junkers Ju 88R night fighter of NJG 102 with the full Matratze aerial setup for the Lichtenstein B/C UHF band radar.

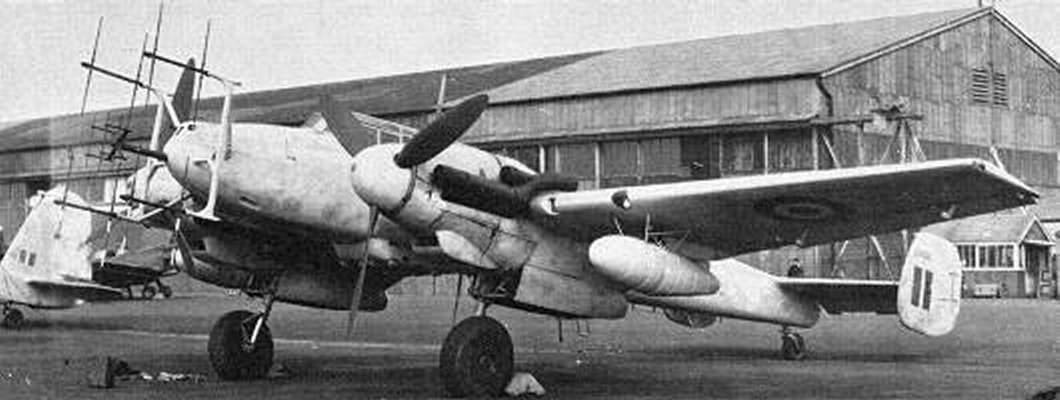
A captured Messerschmitt Bf 110G-4 with first-generation FuG 220 and centrally-mounted short-range FuG 202

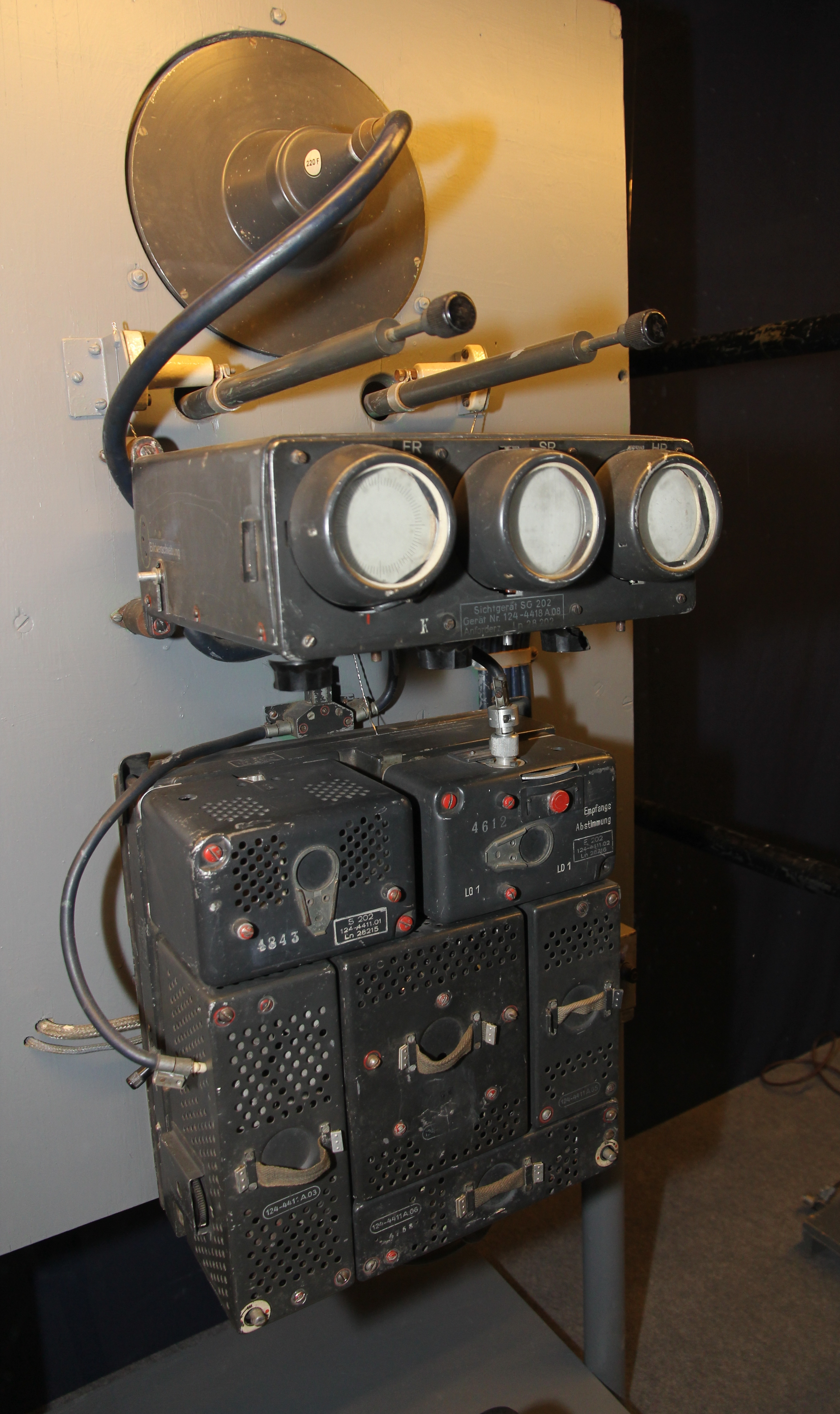
Lichtenstein UHF-band cathode-ray display: • The left tube indicated other aircraft ahead as bumps. • The centre tube indicated range to a specific target and whether they were higher or lower. • The right tube indicated whether the target was to left or right.

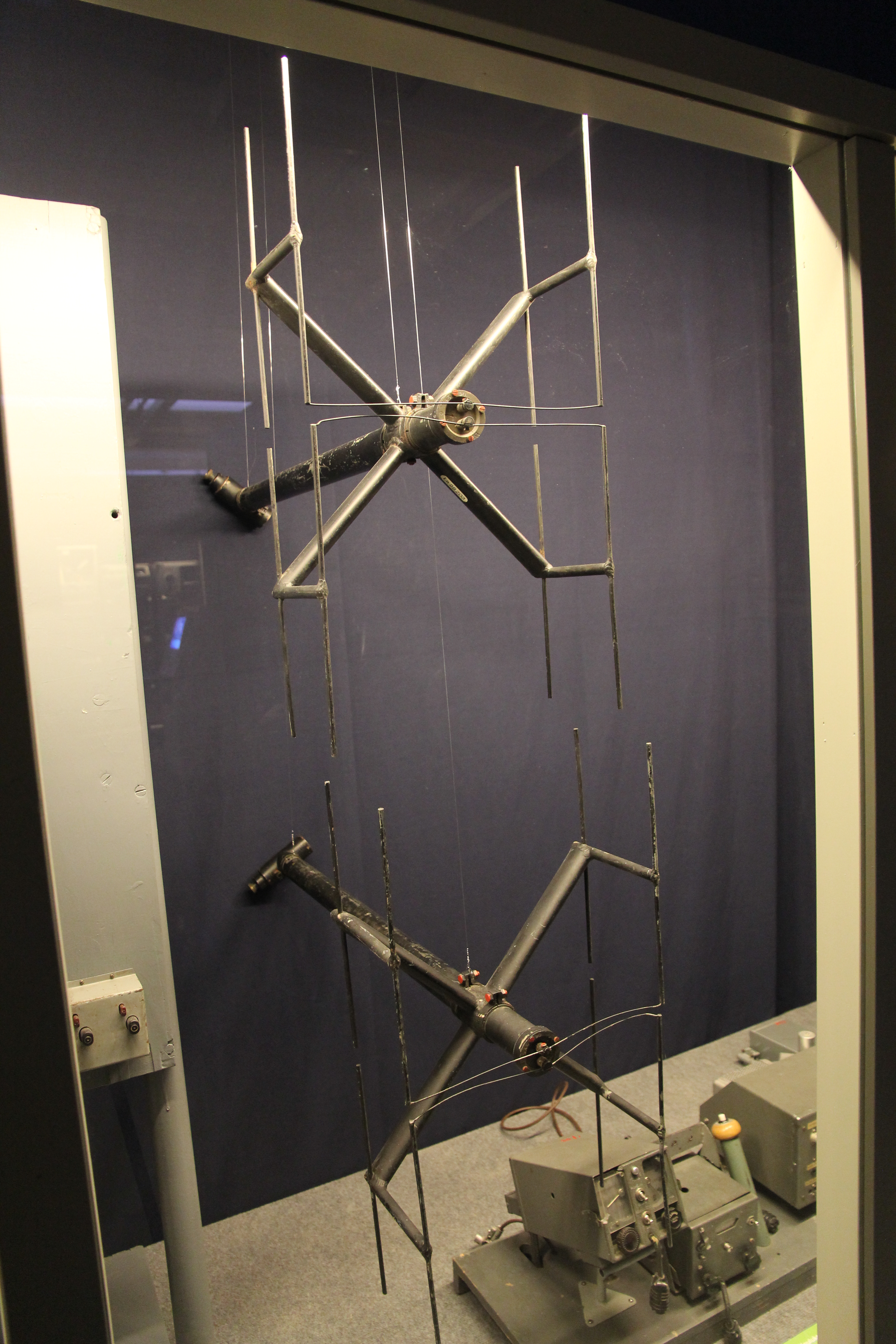
A "pair" of the "subsets" for an earlier Lichtenstein B/C or C-1 "mattress" UHF radar antenna system.

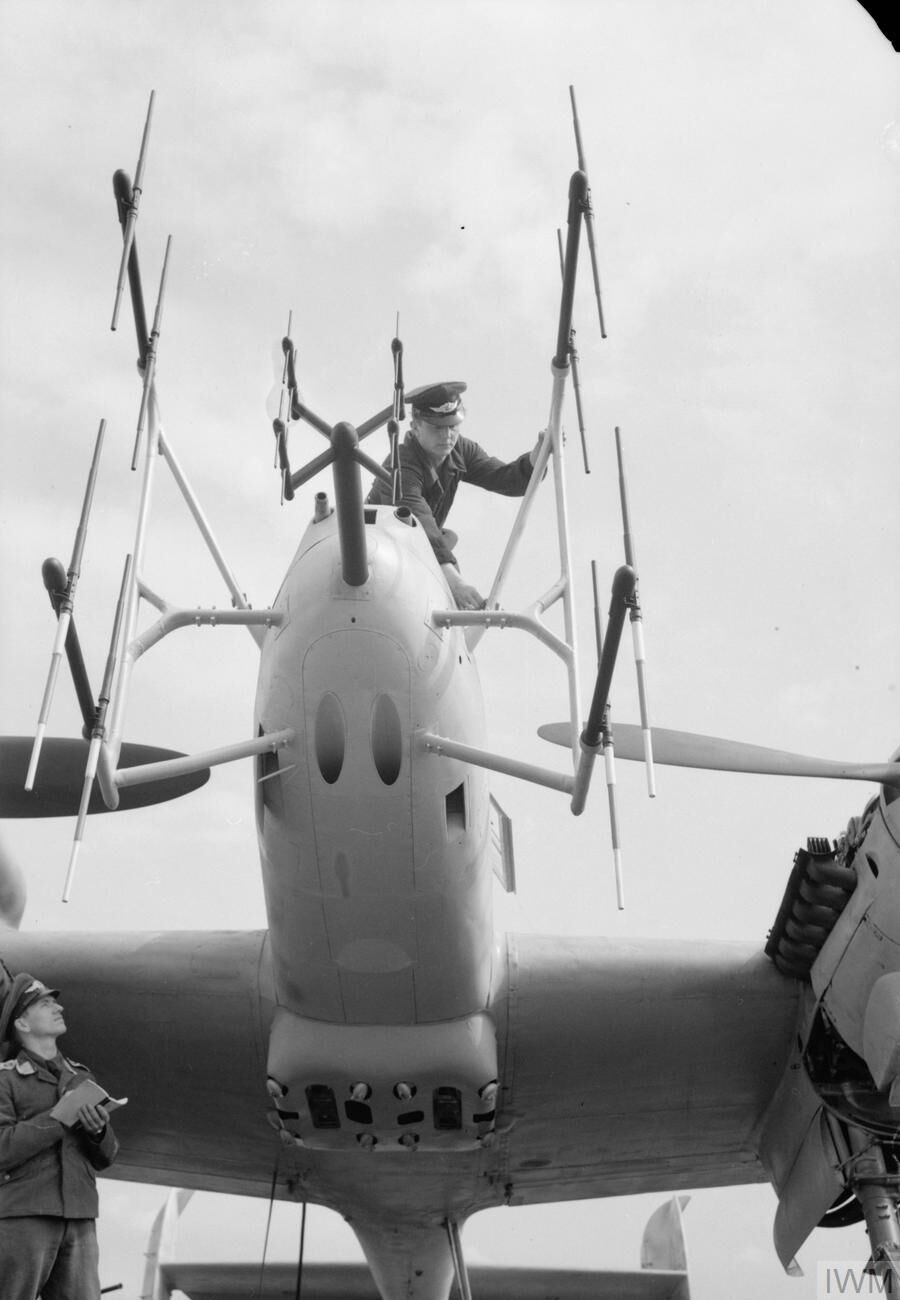
A closeup shot of the same sort of dual-radar antenna installation on a Messerschmitt Bf 110G-4

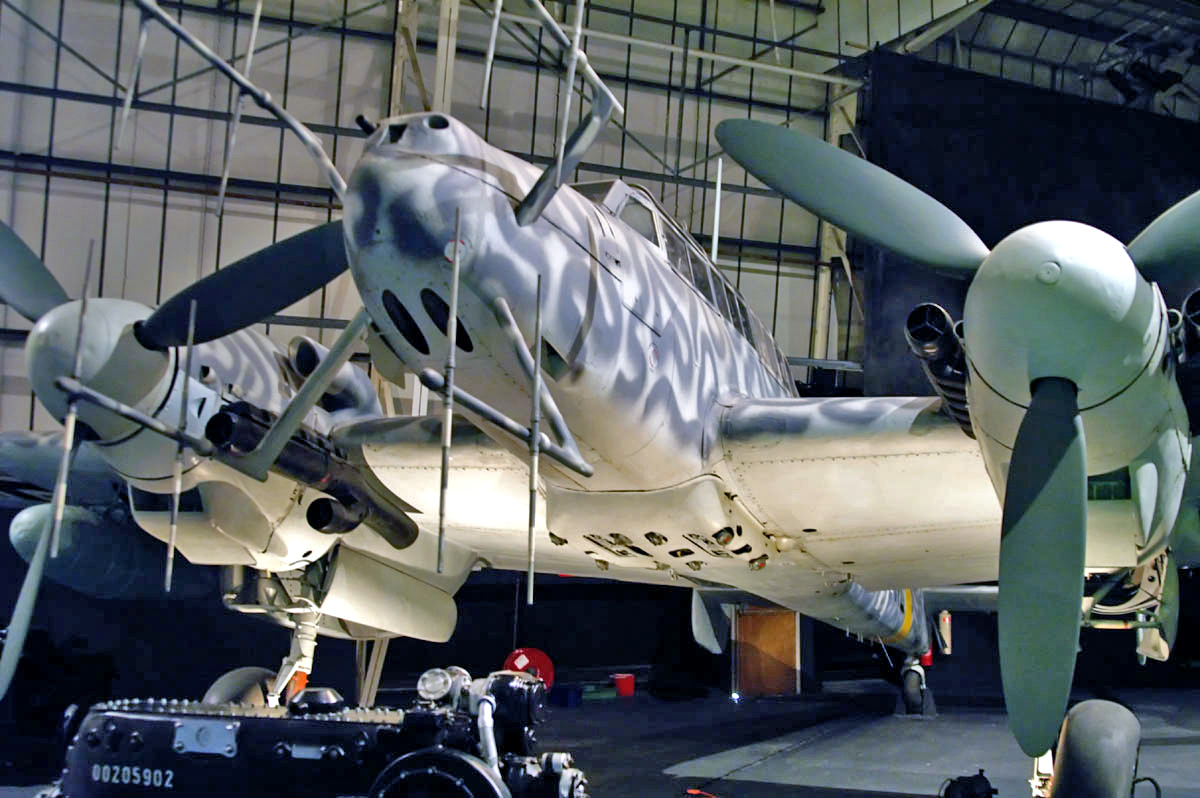
A Bf 110 G-4 in the RAF Museum in Hendon, with second-generation FuG 220 Hirschgeweih (antlers) antennas, without the short-range FuG 202

The Lichtenstein radar was among the earliest airborne radars available to the Luftwaffe in World War II and the first one used exclusively for air interception. Developed by Telefunken, it was available in at least four major revisions, called FuG 202 Lichtenstein B/C, FuG 212 Lichtenstein C-1, FuG 220 Lichtenstein SN-2 and the very rarely used FuG 228 Lichtenstein SN-3. (FuG is short for Funk-Gerät, radio set). The Lichtenstein series remained the only widely deployed airborne interception radar used by the Germans on their night fighters during the war — the competing FuG 216 through 218 Neptun mid-VHF band radar systems were meant as a potentially more versatile stop-gap system through 1944, until the microwave-based FuG 240 "Berlin" could be mass-produced; the Berlin system was still being tested when the war ended.

== FuG 202 Lichtenstein B/C ==
Early FuG 202 Lichtenstein B/C units were not deployed until 1942. They operated at a maximum RF output power of 1.5 kW, on the 61 cm wavelength (490 MHz, or low UHF band), requiring complex Matratze (mattress) antennas, consisting of thirty-two dipole elements, mounted in four groups of eight, each at the forward end of one of four forward-projecting masts.

The four dipoles, with reflectors, produced a wide beam and a wide search angle, ranging from 200 m up to 4 km. Fighter direction came from the Freya radar and Würzburg radar systems. Instead of Lobe switching, Wilhelm Runge and Hans Muth developed a rotating phase-shifter in transmission that produced a twirling beam, mimicking the Würzburg rotating dipole.

== FuG 212 Lichtenstein C-1 ==
During 1943 the Lichtenstein B/C was improved as the FuG 212 Lichtenstein C-1, with longer range and wider angle of view, still operating at UHF Frequencies between 420 and 480 MHz and still using the complex Matratze aerial set. By this point in the war, the British had become experts on jamming German radars. Luftwaffe aircrew of a B/C-equipped Ju 88 R-1 night fighter, Werknummer 360 043, defected in May 1943 and landed at RAF Dyce in Scotland, presenting a working example of the German radar. The aircraft itself is still in existence as an RAF Museum exhibit in the UK. The subsequent refinement of 'Window' (known as Düppel by the Luftwaffe, from the Berlin suburb near where the German version was developed) rendered Lichtenstein B/C almost useless for several crucial weeks.

== FuG 220 Lichtenstein SN-2 ==
By late 1943, the Luftwaffe was starting to deploy the greatly improved FuG 220 Lichtenstein SN-2, operating on a lower frequency of 90 MHz (lower end of the US VHF FM broadcast band) which was far less affected by electronic jamming, but this required the much larger Hirschgeweih (stag's antlers) antennas, with only eight dipole elements, looking like a much-enlarged version of what occupied the forward end of each one of the earlier quadruple Matratze masts. This aerial setup also produced tremendous drag and slowed the operating aircraft by up to 50 km/h (30 mph).

The first SN-2 set had a problem with a huge minimum range of 900 meters, initially requiring the retention of a supplementary B/C or C-1 set with its full set of four Matratze masts, but the alarming drag that full sets of both types of antennas caused, from both radars being installed, later changed the requirement to only a "one-quarter" subset of the earlier Matratze array at the end of a single mast, centrally mounted on the nose of the aircraft when the BC or C-1 UHF radar remained installed. Improvements in early 1944 led to newer SN-2 versions with lower minimum range, which allowed the older UHF radar system to be removed entirely.

In July 1944, the newest version of the SN-2 radar fell into Allied hands when a fully equipped Ju 88 G-1, of 7 Staffel/NJG 2, flew the wrong way on a landing beacon and landed at RAF Woodbridge in England by accident, with the crew not realising the mistake until it was too late to destroy the radar or IFF gear. This led to successful jamming of several frequency bands of the FuG 220 (I to III, 72, 81 and 90 MHz), and a partial adoption of the use of the low-to-mid VHF band 170 MHz FuG 216 and 217 Neptun radar — which used eight shorter-length dipoles in the same "stag's antlers" layout for its frequency ranges than the SN-2 did — but several other bands that the SN-2 used were still operational. After the Allied jammings the FuG 220 antenna setup was optimized for the still-operational bands, the 90-degree vertical dipole setup was changed to a 45-degree diagonal setup.

== Late-war developments ==
Late in 1944, the Morgenstern (Morningstar) antenna, comprising a doubled set of two Yagi antenna arrays at 90° angles to each other, on a central, forward projecting mast was developed, and used by both the SN-2 and Neptun radar sets. This was just compact enough to fit into the nose of a Ju 88G, and was covered with a rubber-coated, wooden conical radome with the extreme tip of each element barely protruding above the surface. Further development led to the FuG 228 Lichtenstein SN-3 radar set but this saw little to no service. A 9 cm wavelength system known as FuG 240 Berlin was developed, based on captured examples of the Allies' cavity magnetron technology but saw little to no operational use.

== Operational history and Allied countermeasures ==
On the night of 8/9 August 1941, Ludwig Becker and his radio operator (Bordfunker) Josef Staub, became the first Luftwaffe night fighter crew to intercept an enemy bomber using airborne radar. Flying Dornier Do 215 B-5 of 4.Staffel/NJG 1 "G9+OM" equipped with the FuG 202 Lichtenstein B/C radar, they tracked and claimed a Vickers Wellington bomber shot down. The aircraft shot down was Wellington T2625 GR-B which crashed near Bunde.

The British knew in 1942 that Luftwaffe night fighters were having unprecedented success tracking aircraft. A specialist team was set up to attempt to identify the electronic characteristics of any German airborne apparatus. A Vickers Wellington bomber was adapted, with a Technical Officer and monitoring equipment in the fuselage. This aircraft flew on bombing raids as a decoy, hoping to be intercepted. In December 1942, on the 18th sortie, it was tracked and intercepted by a Luftwaffe night fighter, sustaining heavy damage and then ditching in the sea off Kent, England. The aircrew transmitted and brought back the electronic data, surviving the ditching. The electronics specialist, Pilot Officer Jordan, was awarded the Distinguished Service Order, unusual for that rank of officer.

Following the capture in May 1943 of the Ju 88 R-1, Werknummer 360 043 that was equipped with it, the Allies were able to jam and track the early FuG 202 and 212 sets by the summer of 1943. During several months in this period they rendered these sets almost useless by blinding them with Window, termed Düppel by the Germans. Full jamming of the SN-2 took longer but was finally accomplished by the Allies following the mistaken landing due to a navigation error of a Ju 88G-1 night fighter from 7.Staffel/NJG 2 at RAF Woodbridge, equipped with both the Flensburg radar detector and the SN-2 radar on July 13, 1944, compromising both systems to the Allies. Some Allied aircraft were then equipped with 'Piperack' which countered the Lichtenstein SN-2 aerial intercept radar. Much more dangerous were Mosquito intruders equipped with a device called Serrate to allow them to track German night fighters by emissions from their Lichtenstein B/C, C-1 or SN-2 sets.

The corkscrew manoeuvre was developed to remove an attacked heavy bomber from within the 60-degree cone of coverage of an attacking night fighter's Lichtenstein radar. The technique was developed using the WkNr. 360 043, early model UHF-band Lichtenstein C-1-equipped, Ju 88R-1 night fighter, that had landed at RAF Dyce in April 1943 by its crew of defectors. It was also later flown in tests by the RAF enemy aircraft evaluation unit, 1426 Flight, known colloquially as the Rafwaffe.

== See also ==
- No. 100 Group RAF
- List of WW II Japanese airborne radar systems
