= Jagdschloss radar =

German early warning radar system of World War II

Jagdschloss
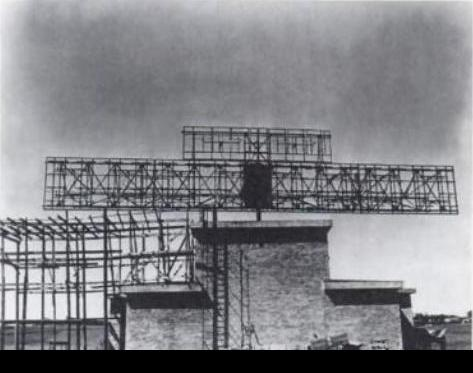
- Jagdschloss captured in 1945 while still under construction
- Country of origin: Germany
- Introduced: 1943
- Type: Early warning radar
- Frequency: 129–165 MHz
- PRF: 500 per second
- Pulsewidth: 1μs
- Range: 80 kilometres (50 mi)
- Azimuth: 360°
- Power: 30 kW

Jagdschloss, officially the FuG 404, was the designation of a German early warning and battle control radar developed just prior to the start of World War II. Although it was built in limited numbers, Jagdschloss is historically important as the first radar system to feature a plan position indicator display, or "PPI". In Germany this type of display was referred to as "Panorama". It is named for Jagdschloss, a hunting lodge.

== Development ==
The PPI effort started fairly early in the history of radar; Hans Hollmann of Telefunken filed a patent for the multi-phase electrostatic deflection in a cathode-ray tube "along a conical surface of revolution" "such as required in practice for instance for the feeding of certain directional antenna systems, or the like" in 1936. At that time development of GEMA's other radars, notably the Freya, took priority, and work on the system did not start until 1939. By this time, radar development had progressed to the point were a prototype could be constructed by re-using systems from various production radars.

A prototype system was built 35 km west of Berlin, known as the Tremmen Radar Tower. It mounted a large antenna consisting of two rows of four half-wave dipoles aligned horizontally, rotating on a shaft located at the top of the tower. It was found that at least five pulses needed to be returned in order for the target to become visible on the scope, so the rotation rate of the antenna was adjusted to synchronize with the pulse repetition frequency of the radar. The radio equipment was taken from the Wassermann and Freya units, and operated on a basic wavelength of 2.4 m (~125 MHz).

== Production units ==
Although the system demonstrated its utility, further units were not ordered until the fall of 1942, likely due to the increasing tempo of RAF Bomber Command's night offensives at that time. Production Jagdschloss units were larger than the original prototype, with an antenna 24 m (79 ft) wide and 3 m (9.8 ft) tall. New electronics were built for the production units, operating on one of two bands, the A band on 1.2-1.9 m or the B band on 1.9-2.5 m. The first production sets were delivered by Siemens & Halske at the end of 1943, and when production ended in April 1945 a total of 80 units had been delivered.

Jagdschloss units were found to have several "dead spots" due to the antenna being located on an 8-metre-high (26 ft) tower. For instance, an aircraft flying at 6,000 m (20,000 ft) altitude at any range between 60–80 km (37–50 mi; 32–43 nmi) would be invisible because the direct reflection from the aircraft would interfere with the one reflecting off the ground. This problem was initially solved with the addition of a large wire mesh under the tower, known as Reflektor-Netz.

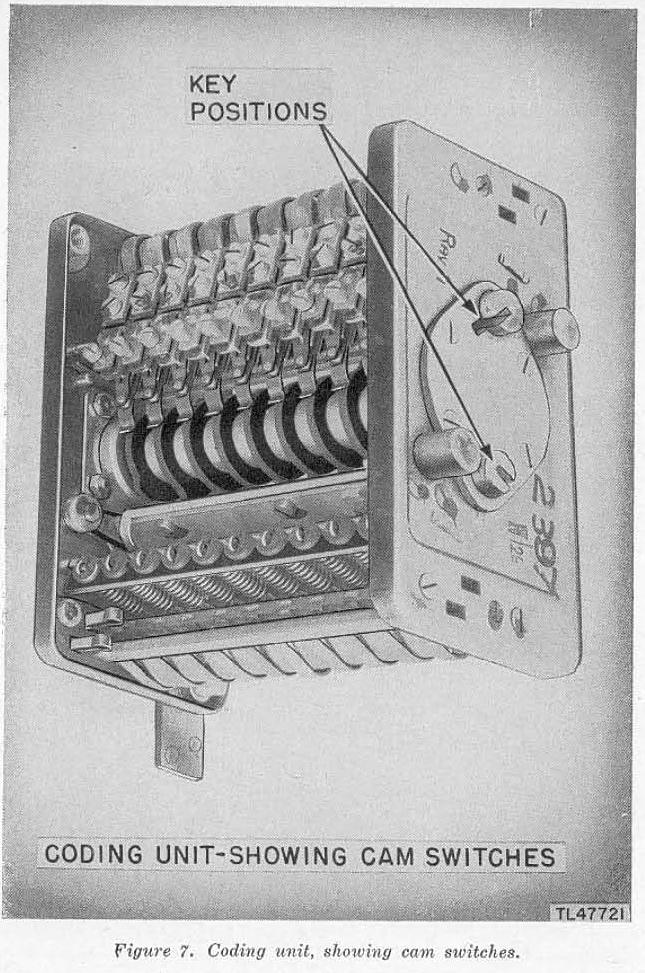
Erstling codegenerator

A more convincing solution to this problem was deployed as Jagdschloss Michael. Michael added a second antenna on the "back" of the original, operating on a 50 cm wavelength system from Telefunken (almost certainly adapted from their Würzburg radar). Range was also increased from the original 150–300 km (93–186 mi; 81–162 nmi), which required an improvement in the angular resolution in order to maintain the ability to resolve aircraft. To achieve this, Michael used a new 50-metre-wide (160 ft) antenna replacing the older 24 m one. The antenna was so large that the mounting had to be re-designed, with the antenna supported by rollers running in a track as opposed to being mounted off a central shaft.

Another cm-wavelength experiment was built at Werneuchen, east of Berlin, known as Jagdschloss Z. This system operated on a 9 cm wavelength, which was very short for the era. The antenna was built up from the center sections of the Würzburg radar's parabolic dish, stacked vertically to form a single 72-wavelength aperture antenna.

Jagdschloss units of all types were optionally fitted with the Erstling IFF system. Like British IFF units, Erstling fed back its own return upon reception of a Jagdschloss signal. The return signal was slightly delayed, appearing as a second "blip" on the radar screen, allowing the operator to visually identify friendly aircraft. Unlike British systems, Erstling apparently sent back a morse code signal in return.

The FuG25a "Erstling" had two encryption keys inside, each of 10 bits. One called "Reichskennung" and the other "Verbandskennung" (squadron key).

A related system, Jagdhütte (German: "hunting cabin"), is also mentioned in reference to Erstling. This was a reduced version of Jagdschloss without radar receiver, operating only with the IFF Signals from Erstling. This was for control of the Luftwaffe's own night fighters only. Due to the different transmit and receiving frequencies, it was resistant against Düppel interference.

Another optional system for use with Jagdschloss was a remote PPI display known as Landbriefträger (German: country mailman). This allowed the display from a Jagdschloss site to be sent via telephone lines to the flak defenses so they could arrange their attacks locally. Signals from the original Tremmen and the later Werneuchen radars were forwarded to the flak tower close by the Berlin Zoo.

== Site locations ==
Station Code Name	Nearest Village/Town	Country	Narrative	Latitude/Longitude	Ref
AAL	Altomünster, Dachau in Bavaria	Germany	Harreszell / Wagenried		
BÄR A	Werneuchen, Brandenburg	Germany	SW near Blumberg		
BERGZIEGE	Erlenkopf, Wasgau, Rhineland-Palatinate	Germany			
BOCK	Olsker, Bornholm island	Denmark			
BREME	Bremerhaven, Free Hanseatic City of Bremen	Germany	At Öse		
BRUMMBÄR	Budkovice near Ivančice	Czech Republic	alongside route 15253	49.084066, 16.362169	
DACHS-MITTE	Gernsheim, Hesse	Germany			
ENGERLING	Přílezy near Útvina	Czech Republic		50.086507, 12.945413	
ERPEL	Neustadt an der Aisch, Bavaria	Germany			
FALTER I	La Mornandière, Chazelles-sur-Lyon	France		45.637348, 4.352014	
FAUN	Skovby near Galten	Denmark			
FERKEL	Schlagsdorf / Petersdorf, Mecklenburg-Vorpommern	Germany			
FLAMINGO	Fürstenwalde, Brandenburg	Germany			
GAZELLE	Veendam near Groningen	Netherlands			
HAMSTER	Oostkapelle / Domburg, Zeeland	Netherlands		51.570269, 3.521230	
HASE	Harderwijk, Gelderland	Netherlands		52.334495, 5.595638	
HEIDSCHNUCKE	Heiligenhaus, North Rhine-Westphalia	Germany	towards Unterlip		
HUMMEL B SÜD	Marxen / Ramelsloh; Harburg, Lower Saxony	Germany			
KORALLE	Krakovany, Kolín District	Tschechien		50.061319, 15.393324	
KRAKE	Köthen, Saxony-Anhalt	Germany			
LIEBENBERG	Großdubrau near Krotoszyce	Poland			
LINDWURM	Fraer, Limfjord	Denmark			
MADE	Mendhausen, Thuringia	Germany		50.379305, 10.470260	
MÖWE	Renningen, Baden-Württemberg	Germany			
RATTLER	Hamm, North Rhine-Westphalia	Germany	WSW Herringen		
RHEINSALM	Saerbeck, North Rhine-Westphalia	Germany	1 km east		
ROBBE NORD	Skærbæk, Jutland	Denmark	west at Tvismaerk		
SCHAKAL	Skagen, Jutland	Denmark			
SEEHUND	Skelby (Seeland Mitte)	Denmark			
SEESTERN	Mrągowo (Sensburg)	Poland			
SILBERFUCHS	Siegen, Westphalian	Germany		50.884008, 8.038082	
STAR	Ladelund, Schleswig-Holstein	Germany			
STEINBOCK	Wunstorf, Lower Saxony	Germany	at Winzlar	52.448973, 9.259528	
TAPIR	Cerhonice / Radobytce	Czech Republic		49.413988, 14.041572	
TRAMPELTIER	Tremmen, Brandenburg	Germany			
WELLENSITTICH	Weißenfels, Saxony-Anhalt	Germany	4 km south		
	Aken (Elbe), Saxony-Anhalt	Germany			
	Boostedt, Schleswig-Holstein	Germany			
Kriegsmarine site	Łężyce near Gdynia	Poland		54.532096, 18.392182	
	Langendorf, Saxony-Anhalt	Germany	alongside A9 motorway	51.158737, 11.990475	
Kriegsmarine site	Lönsweg near Wilhelmshaven, Lower Saxony	Germany			
Kriegsmarine site	Raehr near Hanstholm	Denmark		57.099852, 8.677879	
	Sletterhage, Kattegat	Denmark			
Kriegsmarine site	Świnoujście	Poland			
	Vukovar	Croatia			
	Wladimirowka	Kaliningrad			

== Notes ==
Original Service Manual (115 pages)

- The document states that the Jagdschloss units worked in two bands in the description text, but in three bands in another part of the document. The third band is 2.4 to 4.0 m.
- The document's description of Jagdschloss Michael states the second signal was sent out of the back of the antenna, and operated on a 50 cm wavelength. However, the description is not entirely clear, and the difference in wavelengths would make this somewhat difficult to arrange. Generally the range of a 50 cm unit would also be shorter than longer wavelengths on the other side, due to limitations of the electronics of the era, but the document does not state if the range of this "side" of the system was any different.
