= Ammentorp =

Surname list

Ammentorp is a surname. Notable people with the surname include:

- Johan Ammentorp (1860–1931), Danish medical doctor
- Kjeld Ammentorp (1895–1975), British businessman

== See also ==
- Christian Ditlev Ammentorp Hansen (1843–1916), Danish pharmacist and industrialist
