= Rågeleje =

- Town
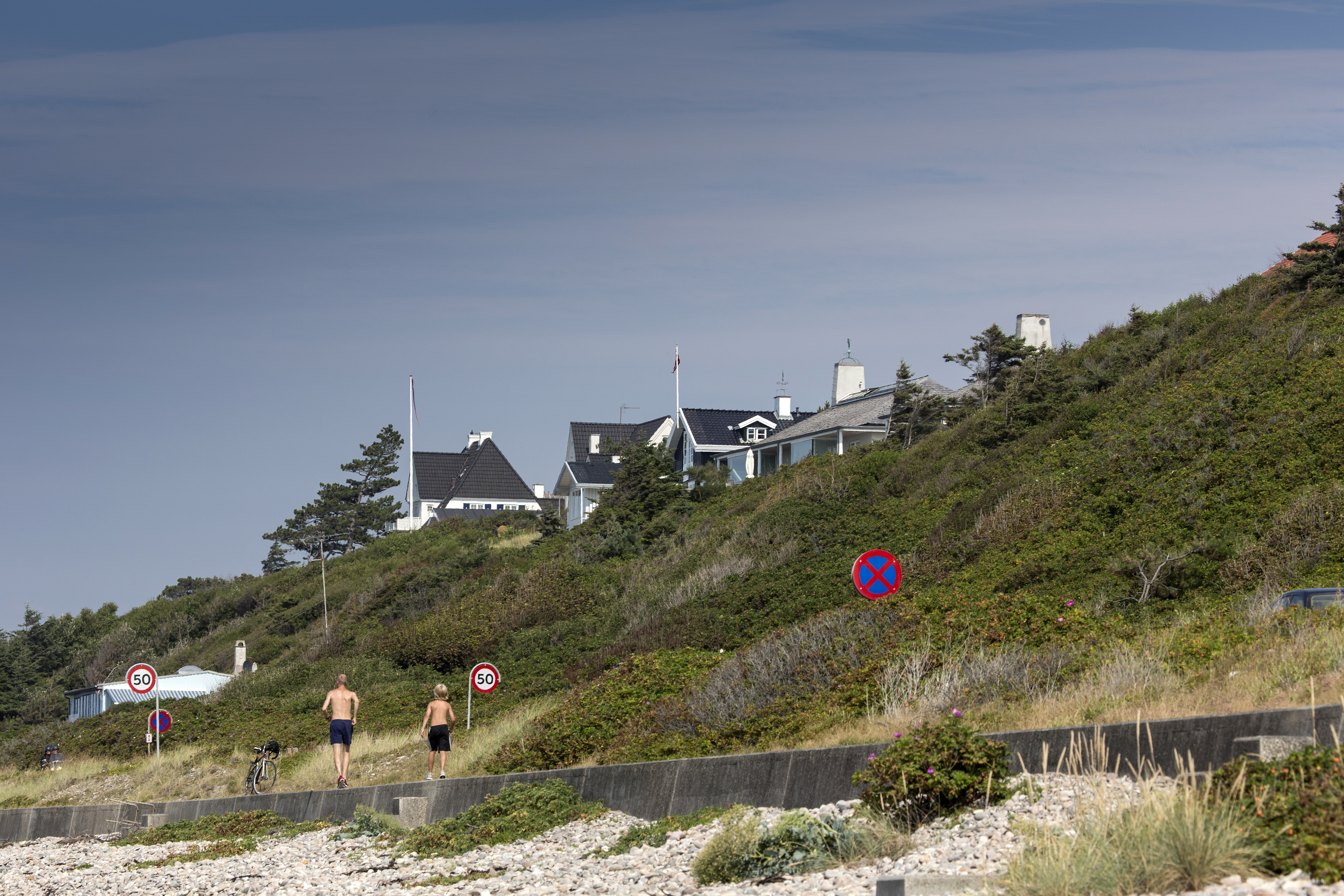

- Location in Denmark Rågeleje (Capital Region)
- Coordinates: 56°05′58″N 12°09′44″E
- Country: Denmark
- Region: Capital (Hovedstaden)
- Municipality: Gribskov

Population (2026)
  - Total: 681
- Time zone: UTC+1 (CET)
  - Summer (DST): UTC+2 (CEST)
- Postal code: 3250

Rågeleje is a former fishing village and popular tourist resort on the north coast of Zealand, midway between Gilleleje and Tisvildeleje, some 50 km north of Copenhagen, Denmark. As of 2026, it had a population of 681.

== History ==
=== The fishing village ===
The name Rågeleje was first mentioned in 1582 in the form Raageleie, meaning the harbour of Råge (1211 Roka), a no longer existing settlement. Rågeleje remained a quiet fishing community where the families supplemented their income with a bit of sheep herding until the late 19th century. The fishing village was located at the mouth of the Højbro Stream. The fisherman on the west side of the stream was traditionally known as the Vejby fishermen while the ones on the east side were known as the Hesselbjerg fishermen. Rågeleje had 55 residents in 1890 of which 13 were fishermen. The number of residents had by 1911 declined to 34 of which 10 were fishermen.

=== 1910s: New residents ===
The first tourists began to arrive at the turn of the 20th century. In the early 1910s, Anders Nielsen, the owner of Damgården, sold most of his land off in lots to wealthy people from the city. Anders Nielsen's Son, Niels Nielsen, made a business out of picking the new residents and their belongings up in Helsinge at the beginning of the summer season and to drive them back at the end of the season. Anders Nielsens was Vej was after Anders Nielsen's death named after him and the new landowners in 1921 erected a memorial stone at the end of the road to commemorate him.

A beach hotel soon opened. The slope towards the beach was protected by the conservation authorities on the initiative of the lot owners in 1940.

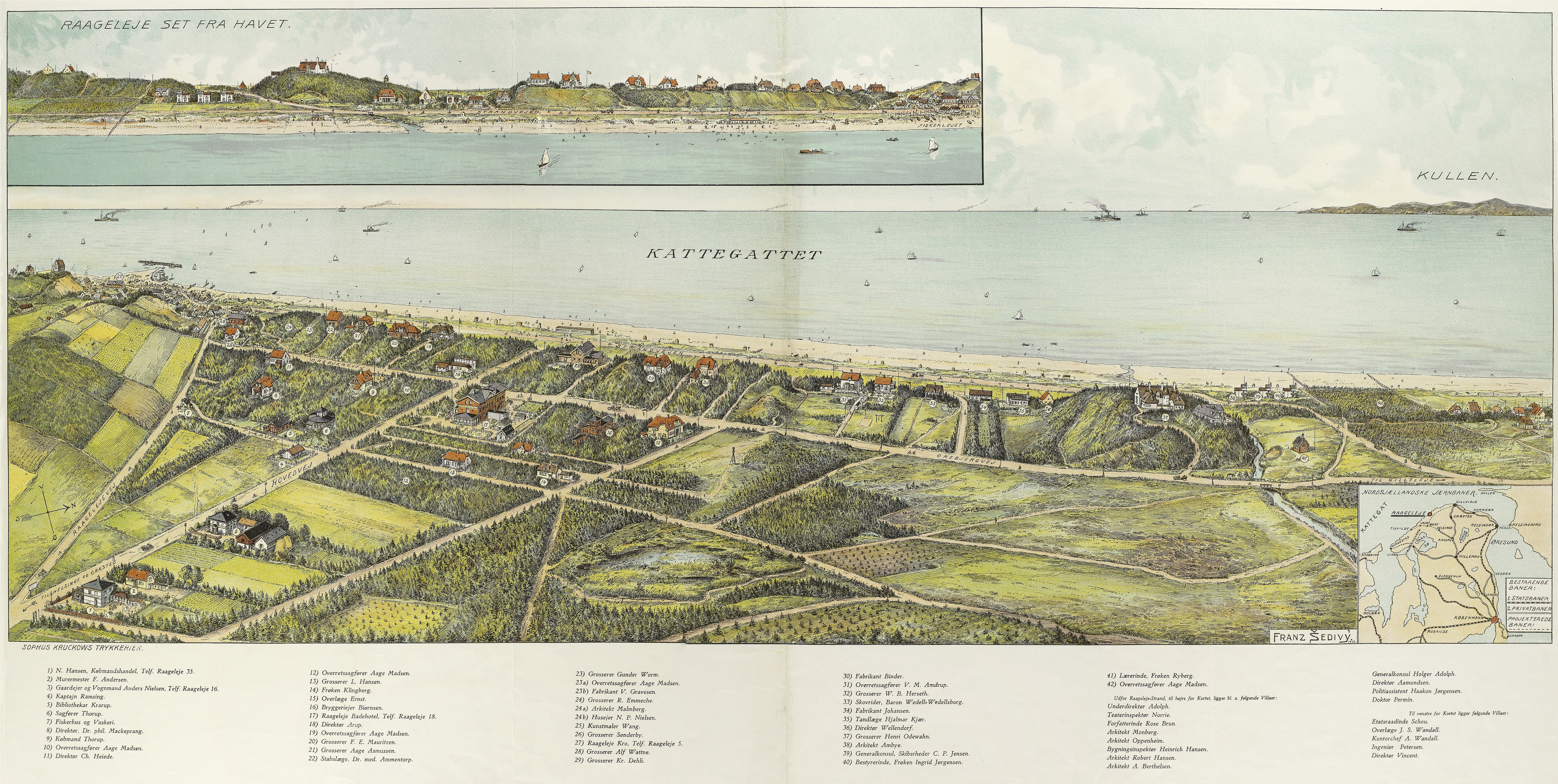
A 1915 bird's-eye view of Rågeleje by Franz Kediv with a directory of local landmarks and house owners:
1. N. Hansen, grocery store, telph.Raageleje 35
2. Master mason F. Andersen
3. Farmer Anders Nielsen, telph. Raageleje 16
4. Captain Ramsing
5. Manufacturer Krarup
6. Attorney Thorup
7. Fisherman's house and laundry
8. Director, Dr. phil Mouritz Mackeprang
9. Merchant Thorup
10. Director Chr. Heiede
11. High Court Attorney Aage Madsen
12. Businessman N. Hansen
13. Miss Klingberg
14. Doctor Ernst
15. Brewery owner Bjørnsen
16. Raageleje Beach Hotel, telph. Raageleje 18
17. Director Arup
18. High Court Attorney Aage Madsen
19. Businessman F. E. Mauritzen
20. Businessman Aage Asmunsen
21. Chief Medical Corps Physicist, Dr. med. Ammentorp
22. Businessman Gunder Worm
23. High Court Attorney Aage Madsen
24. Manufacturer V. Gravesen
25. Businessman R. Emmeche
26. Astrid Malmberg
27. House owner N. P. Nielsen
28. Artist Wang
29. Businessman Sønderby
30. Raageleje Inn, telph. Raageleje 5
31. Businessman Alf Watne
32. Businessman Kr. Dahli
33. Manufacturer Binder
34. High Court Attorney V. M. Andrup
35. Businessman V. B. Herseth
36. Forrester Baron Wedell-Wedellsberg
37. Manufacturer Johansen
38. Dentist Hjalmar Kjær
39. Director Wellerdorf
40. Businessman Henri Odewahn
41. Architect Ambye
42. Consul-General, ship broker C. P. Jensen
43. Principal Miss Ingrid Jørgensen
44. Teacher Miss Ryberg
45. High Court Attorney Aage Madsen

=== Later history ===
In the late 1940s and 1950s, Rågeleje's inn was a popular hangout for jazz musicians, artists and actors. The inn was later destroyed in a fire.

== Today ==
Dorthea's House from 1752 is the oldest house remaining in Rågeleje. At the far end of Anders Nielsensvej stands a monument commemorating Anders Nielsens, a farmer who owned most of the land in the area until he sold it off in lots to new residents. His farm, Damgården, is still seen on the left side where the road makes a bend and continues to Unnerup. Rågegården is an Arts & Crafts inspired country house from 1915 designed by Povl Baumann It was listed on the Danish registry of protected buildings and places in 1989.

== Notable residents ==
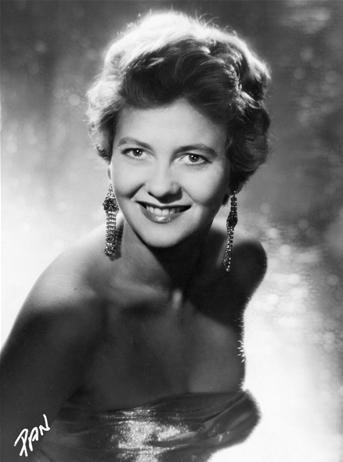
Grethe Sønck, 1959

- Grethe Sønck (1929 - 2010 Rågeleje) a Danish actress and singer

=== Holiday homes ===
- Valdemar Michael Amdrup (1860-1937) a Danish lawyer
- Albert Edvard Wang (1864-1930) a Danish landscape painter
- Helen Schou (1905–2006), sculptor, resided at Huldrebakken
- Jan Leschly (born 1940), former tennis player
- Claus Meyer (born 1963), gastronomic entrepreneur

== Image gallery ==
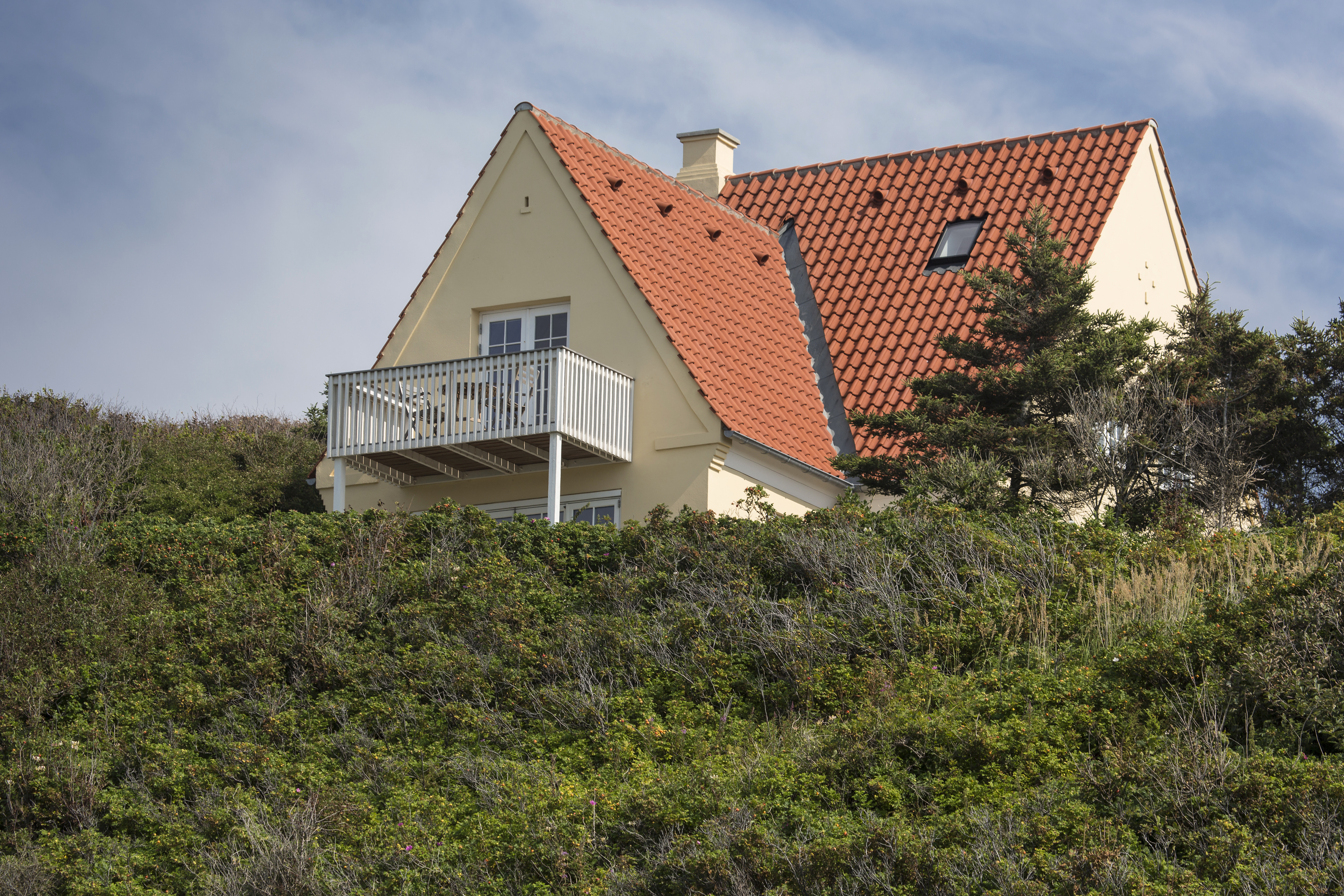
A house on the cliff

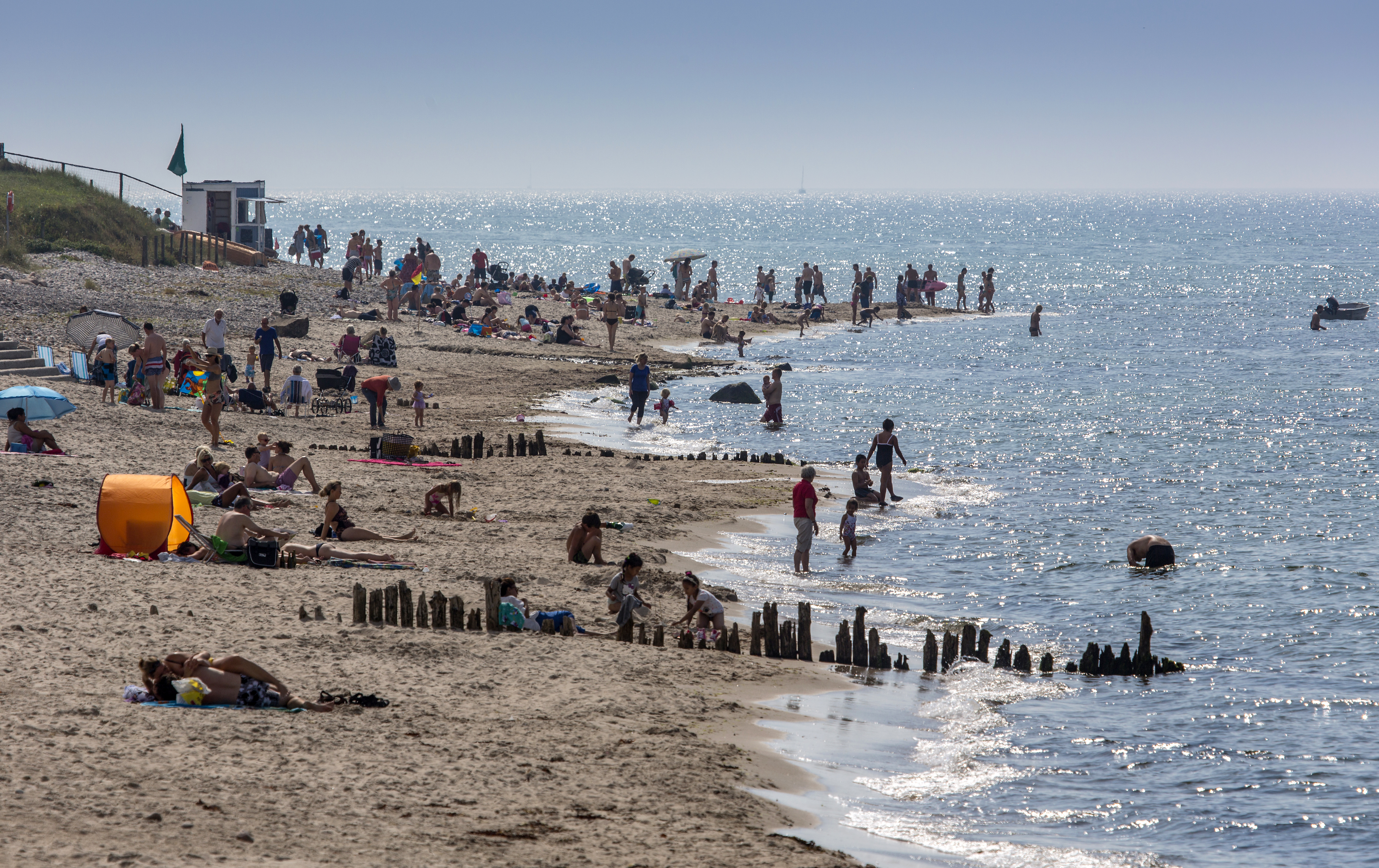
The beach

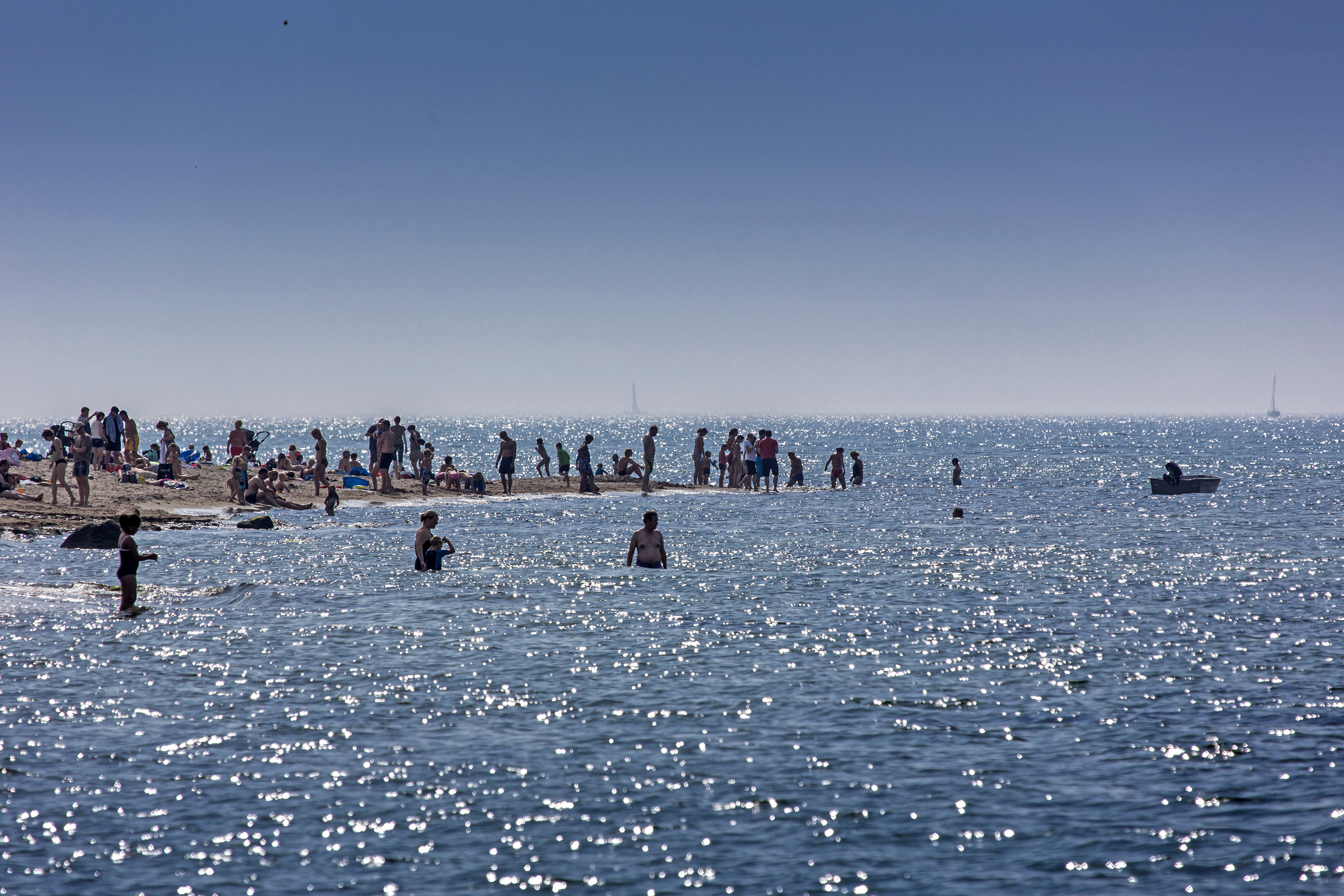
The beach

== See also ==
- Hornbæk
