= Surgeon General (Denmark) =

Professional healthcare advisor of the Danish military health jurisdiction

- Generallæge (Danish)
- Incumbent; Susanne Bach Lausten since 28 April 2023
- Armed Forces Medical Command
- Type: Surgeon general
- Formation: 21 April 1806; 220 years ago
- First holder: Nicolaus Tønder

The Surgeon General (Danish: Generallæge, lit. 'General doctor') is the highest-ranking medical officer of the Danish Defence. Until 2023, the holder of administrative leadership of the Armed Forces Medical Command was also Surgeon General.

== History ==
Until the beginning of the 19th century, the chief surgeon of the army was a temporary position established only in times of conflict. However, there was an increased wish to have a permanent position to plan, supervise and be available to the higher command authorities. As such the Stabskirurg (transl. Staff surgeon) was established on 21 April 1806, with the rank of major.

In 1838, the title was changed to the Stabslæge (transl. Staff doctor), which was elevated to colonel in 1848. The position was however demoted back to major by 1852. The rank was re-elevated to colonel on 3 January 1861.

Following the Army law of 1867, the army and navy staff doctors were collected into a unified corps. The unified corps was spilt again in 1880, as it was decided that the naval medical corps be disbanded.

On 13 April 1894, the rank was elevated to major general.

On 1 November 1951, the Army Medical Corps (Hærens Lægekorps) and the Naval Medical Corps (Marinens Lægekorps) were collected into the joint Defence Medical Corps (Forsvarets Lægekorps), which also included the newly formed air force. Following the adoption of the brigade general rank in 1983, the position was made a brigade general.

By 1991, the name was changed to Defence Health Service (Forsvarets Sundhedstjeneste). This merged with the (Forsvarets Sanitetsskole) in 2002.

In 2018, the name was changed to Medical Command (Forsvarets Sanitetskommando).

With increased responsibility of the Forsvarets Sanitetskommando, the leadership role was split in two, in April 2023. One administrator and one healthcare advisor.

== List of officeholders ==
| No. | Portrait | Name (born–died) | Term of office | | | Ref. |
| No. | Portrait | Name (born–died) | Took office | Left office | Time in office | Ref. |
Army staff surgeon (Stabskirurg ved Landetaten)
| 1 | | Nicolaus Tønder (1764–1832) | 21 April 1806 | 5 January 1832 † | 25 years, 259 days | |
| 2 | | Johann Christian Wilhelm Wendt (1778–1838) | 5 February 1832 | 4 March 1838 † | 6 years, 27 days | |
Army staff physician (Stabslæge for Hæren)
| 3 | | Johan Conrad Müller (1789–1869) | 10 March 1838 | 28 September 1863 | 25 years, 208 days | |
| 4 | | Michael Djørup (1803–1876) | 28 September 1863 | 1867 | 3–4 years | |
Staff Physician and Chief of the Joint Army and Navy Medical Corps (Stabslæge og Chef for det for Hæren og Flaaden fælles Lægekorps)
| 4 | | Michael Djørup (1803–1876) | 1867 | 13 August 1873 | 5–6 years | |
| 5 | | Nota Salomon (1823–1885) | 31 August 1873 | 1 November 1880 | 7 years, 62 days | |
Army staff physician (Stabslæge for Hæren)
| 5 | | Oberst; Nota Salomon (1823–1885) | 1 November 1880 | 20 March 1885 † | 4 years, 139 days | |
| 6 | | Generalmajor; Johan Christian Møller (1835–1902) | 20 March 1885 | 25 April 1902 † | 17 years, 36 days | |
| 7 | | Generalmajor; Hieronymus Laub (1838–1910) | 25 April 1902 | 1908 | 5–6 years | |
| 8 | | Generalmajor; Johan Frederik Hempel (1848–1911) | 1908 | 8 March 1911 † | 2–3 years | |
| 9 | | Generalmajor; Frederik Ferdinand Biering (1849–1918) | 8 March 1911 | 1916 | 4–5 years | |
| 10 | | Generalmajor; Johan Ammentorp (1860–1931) | 1916 | 1930 | 13–14 years | |
| 11 | | Generalmajor; Johan Peter Skot-Hansen (1870–1935) | 1930 | 29 October 1935 † | 4–5 years | |
| 12 | | Generalmajor; Emanuel Andreas Gottfred Saugmann (1878–1962) | October 1935 | c. 1948 | 12–13 years | |
| 13 | | Generalmajor; Carl Rudolph Hakon Fasting-Hansen (1893–1981) | c. 1949 | 1963 | 13–14 years | |
| 14 | | Generalmajor; Mogens Winge (?–?) | December 1963 | December 1972 | 9 years | |
| 15 | | Generalmajor; Svend Trier (1923–2020) | 1973 | 1988 | 14–15 years | |
| 16 | | Brigadegeneral; Knud Jessen (1938–2014) | 1988 | 1 April 1998 | 9–10 years | |
| 17 | | Brigadegeneral; Hans-Michael Jelsdorf (1946–) | 1 April 1998 | 2006 | 7–8 years | |
| 18 | | Brigadegeneral; Erik Michael Darre (born 1953) | 2006 | 2013 | 6–7 years | |
| 19 | | Brigadegeneral; Søren Worm-Petersen (–) | 2013 | 28 April 2017 | 3–4 years | |
| 20 | | Brigadegeneral; Sten Hulgaard (–) | 28 April 2017 | 28 April 2023 | 6 years, 0 days | |
| 21 | | Brigadegeneral; Susanne Bach Lausten (born 1961) | 28 April 2023 | Incumbent | 3 years, 133 days | |
