= DSCN =

DSCN is an abbreviation which may refer to -

- Digital Still Capture Nikon
- Data Set Change Notice (in UK National Health service), sometimes also DSC Notice
- Deep Space Communications Network, more often Deep Space Network
- Danish Society for the Conservation of Nature (Danmarks Naturfredningsforening)
- Digital Scan (ASCII)
- Dispersion-Strengthened Cupro-Nickel
