= Luftwaffe and Kriegsmarine radar equipment of World War II =

WWII German radar equipment

German Luftwaffe and Kriegsmarine Radar Equipment during World War II, relied on an increasingly diverse array of communications, IFF and RDF equipment for its function. Most of this equipment received the generic prefix FuG (German: Funkgerät), meaning "radio equipment". During the war, Germany renumbered their radars. From using the year of introduction as their number, they moved to a different numbering scheme.

== Searchlight and fighter control ==
No German ground radar was accurate enough for flak fire direction. The method of operation during the day was for radar to direct the flak's optical fire control towards the target. Once this was acquired, the flak was controlled by the optical equipment to complete the engagement. During the night, the radar would be used to indicate the target to the searchlight crews. The rest of the engagement would be carried out optically. During the day, fighters would be directed with sufficient precision for them to come into visual contact with their targets, while during the night they would use their onboard aircraft interception (AI) radar to find the target after initial direction from the ground-based radars.

=== Early Units ===
Device Name	Code Name	Device Description
FuMG 38L	Kurfürst	Two 2.4-meter parabolic reflectors (one transmit and receive) mounted on a converted Flak mounting. Wavelength 62 cm; range approx 8–12 km.
FuMG 39L	Kurpfalz	A more powerful development of the 38 L. (the L in the designation meant it was built by Lorenz.). Dished units were mounted on the operations van.
FuMG 40L	Kurmark	Developed version of the 39 L; range now up to 25–40 km.

=== Würzburg ===
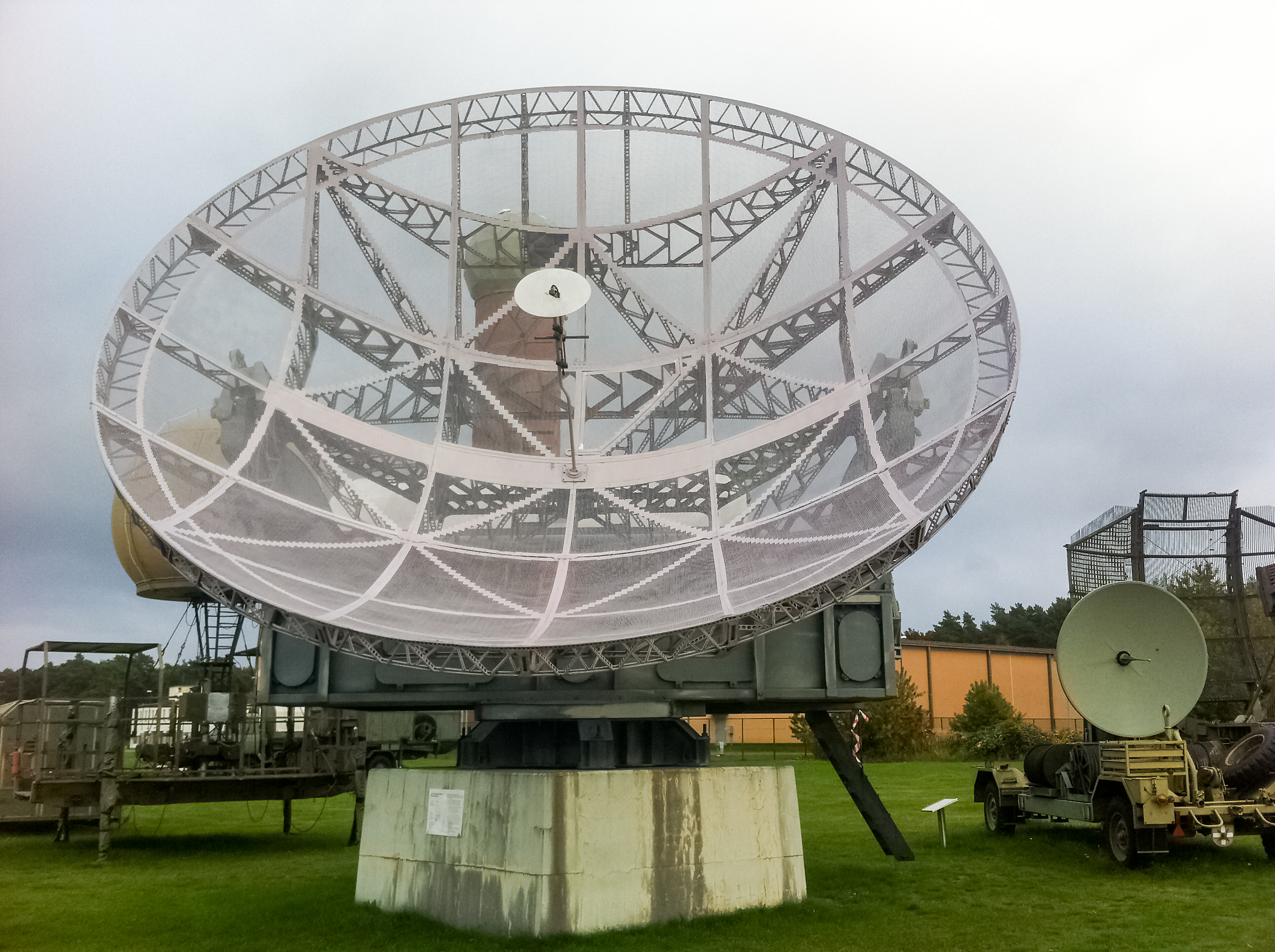
Würzburg-Riese radar

The Würzburg was first operational in the summer of 1940, had a parabolic shaped antenna with a diameter of about 3metres and in some models could be folded in half for transport. The Würzburg was produced in the thousands with various estimated figures being between 3000 and 4000 with up to 1500 sets of Würzburg Riese. The antenna of the Würzburg weighed over 9.5 tons and its parabolic surface had a diameter equal to 7.5 metres and a focal length of one metres and 70 cm. Only one German company had the technical skill to build these radars, and that was Zeppelin. The name of the unit was chosen at random by pointing at a map of Germany and Würzburg was chosen.

FuMG 62 / FuMG 39 Würzburg: 3D fire-control radar. Used to direct the flak optical directors and searchlights. Wavelength 50 cm approx. In response to jamming various models of Würzburg radar were developed to operate on various frequencies called "Islands".

Würzburg A First production version introduced in 1940. 50 cm operating wavelength. Operation range was approximately 30 km. Included an IFF system that worked with the FuG 25z airborne unit.

Würzburg B Integrated IR telescope to increase accuracy. Proved unsatisfactory and not placed into production.

Würzburg C Replaced the model A in production in 1941. Had lobe switching to improve accuracy. On this unit the integral IFF system was replaced by a system based on the FuG 25a airborne. To support this system which worked at approx 125-160 MHz two antenna were placed inside the main dish. A separate interrogation and receiving units were attached to show the IFF responses.

Würzburg D Replaced the model C in production in 1942. It now had a usable range of approximately 40 km. Conical scan was used for fine accuracy. The IFF antenna was now fitted in the center of the dish rather than on the sides. Better instruments were fitted and generally, it was the best of the small Würzburg.

FuMG 65 Würzburg Riese (Giant): The electronics of the D model Würzburg combined with a 7-meter dish to improve resolution and range. Range approx 70 km. Version E was a modified unit to fit on railroad flatcars to produce a mobile Flak radar system. Version G had the 2.4-meter antenna and electronics from a Freya installed. The antenna dipoles were inside the reflector. The reason for this was that the allies were flying very high recon flights which were above the maximum height of the Freya. The standard Würzburg Riese's 50 cm beam was too narrow to find them directly. By combining the two systems the Freya could set the Würzburg Riese onto the target.

=== Mannheim ===
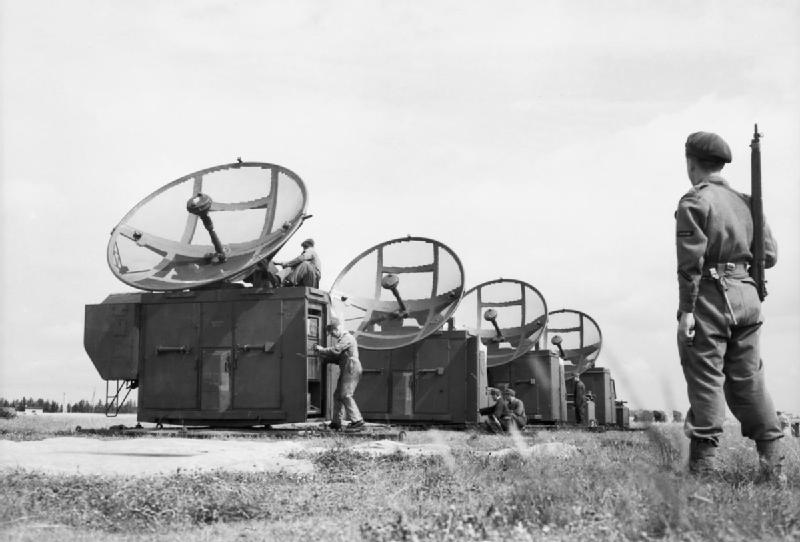
FuMG 64 captured by the British forces in 1945.

FuMG 63 Mainz The Mainz, introduced in 1941, was a development from the Wurzburg with its 3-meter solid metal reflector mounted on top of the same type of control car as used by the ‘Kurmark’. Its range was 25–35 km with an accuracy of ±10–20 meters, azimuth 0.1 degrees, and elevation ±0.3-0.5 degrees. Only 51 units were produced before being superseded by the ‘Mannheim’.

FuMG 64 Mannheim The Mannheim was an advanced development from the ‘Mainz’. It also had a 3-meter reflector, which was now made from a lattice framework covered in a fine mesh. This was fixed to the front of a control cabin and the whole apparatus was rotated electrically. Its range was 25–35 km, with an accuracy of ±10–15 meters; azimuth and elevation accuracy of ±0.15 degrees. Though accurate enough to control Flak guns it was not deployed in large numbers. This was due to its cost (time and materials to manufacture was about three times that of a Würzburg D).

FuMG 75 Mannheim Riese Just as the Wurzburg's performance was greatly improved when fitted with a 7-meter reflector, so was the Mannheim's, and the result called a Mannheim Riese (Giant Mannheim). There was an optical device for the initial visual acquisition of the target. With its narrow beam it was relatively immune from ‘Window’. Its accuracy and automatic tracking enabled it to be used in anti-aircraft missile research to track and control the missiles in flight. Only a handful were manufactured.

FuMG 68 Ansbach There was a need for a mobile radar with the range and accuracy of the ‘Mannheim’. The result, in 1944, was the Ansbach. It had a collapsible reflector of diameter 4.5 meters, operating on a wavelength of 53.6 cm, and peak power of 8 kW, giving it a normal range 25–35 km (70 km in search mode) with an accuracy of 30–40 meters. Azimuth and elevation accuracy was around ±0.2°. The antenna and reflector were remote controlled from a Bayern control van up to 30 meters away. The control system was based on the remote control system of the Michael microwave communication system, this was based on the Ward-Leonard AC/DC control system. The Ansbach was to be installed in large Flak batteries with six or more guns, but only a few were produced by the end of the war, and these did not see operational service

== Medium-range search ==
=== Freya & similar units ===
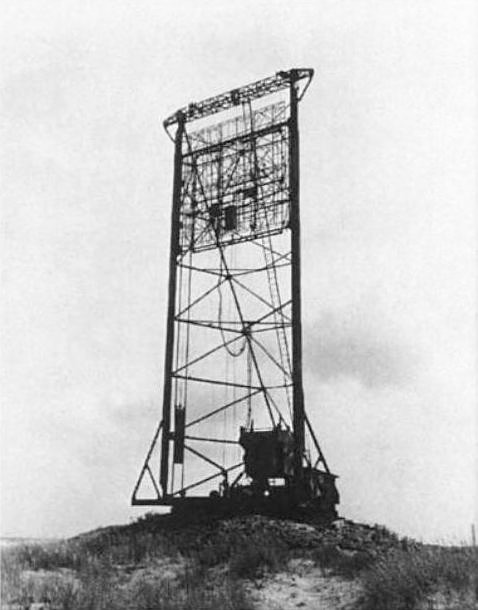
FuMG 401 "Freya-Fahrstuhl"

FuMG 450 Freya / FuMG 41G: This was a 2D Early warning radar. (2D means unable to indicate height). It was used for fighter direction and target indication for the Würzburg. Operating wavelength of approx 2.4 meters (125 MHz). In response to jamming various models were developed to operate on various frequencies called "Islands". Over 1000 units delivered in various models

FuMG 401 / FMG 42 FREYA - LZ (Models A - D). An Air portable version, the model differences were due to an operating frequency range being in 4 discrete bands between 91 and 200 MHz.

Freya-Rotschwarz and Freya-Grünschwarz: These two systems were Freya modified to operate on the same frequency as the British radio navigation system GEE to avoid jamming. However, as by the time they were ready the Germans were jamming GEE it is not clear whether any were ever deployed.

FuMG 451 A Freya Flamme: Freya which had been built to use the "Island D" band were modified to be able to trigger the British IFF equipment. Ranges of up to 450 km were obtained. Fell from use as British IFF procedures improved.

FuMG 401 Freya Fahrstuhl: A 3D version of the Fraya. (3D means could measure height). Measurements made by moving the antenna up and down on a rack. Only a very rough estimation of height available. originally intended for early warning most of the systems produced went to help "jammed" Würzburg

Freya EGON: EGON stood for Erstling Gemse Offensive Navigation system. Where Erstling was the codename of the Fug25a transceiver in the aircraft and Gemse was the codename for the receiver. The system operated on a principle similar to the British OBOE navigation system. An IFF signal was sent from a Freya, that had had its receiver antenna removed, to the aircraft. The Fug25a in the aircraft responded and the received signal was displayed as a range offset on the Freya display. Using a second transmitter and triangulation the position of the aircraft was resolved. Though the system was tested to guide night fighters it was found to be to limited by the number of aircraft that it could control at one time (the same limitation was found with Oboe). The "Y system" was used instead for night fighter control. The EGON system was used to control pathfinders for bombing raids over both England and Russia, however, by now the Luftwaffe bomber force was running out of planes, pilots and fuel so the results were minimal. Work was done using a third transmitter to improve system performance. Range with a normal Freya was up to 250 km, work was underway to use a Wasserman system instead of a Freya to increase range too 350 km. (the Freya signal was too weak to trigger the Fug25a at ranges beyond 250 km), but this was not completed.

== Long-range search ==
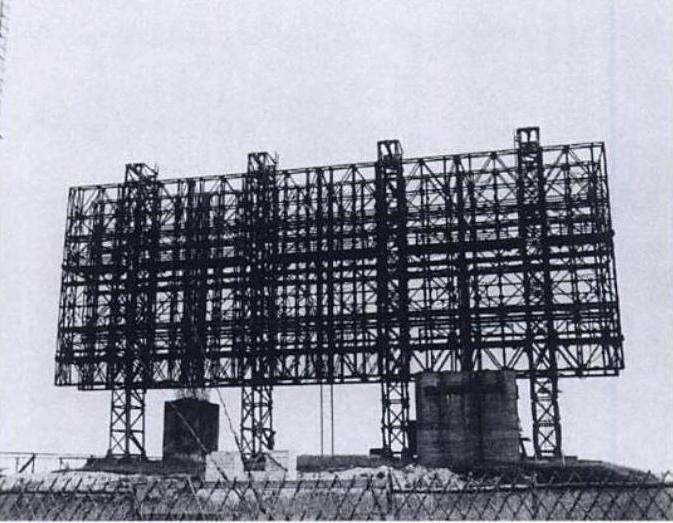
FuMG 41/42 Mammut.

For area air defense (vs point defense) Freya's range was found to be insufficient. This led to attempts to use Freya technology to achieve greater range. This resulted in the Wassermann and Mammut. Although the Mammut units achieved their aims they were large installations with large arrays built on bunkers. This resulted in long building times and vulnerability to air attacks. The Wassermann was a better solution in that being smaller they were harder to locate and quicker to build, 3–4 weeks. However, sources indicate that they never achieved the desired range of 400 km, the best was approx 300 km. This may be why there were so many variants deployed.

FuMG 401 Mammut: First deployed in 1942 this was a long range 2D search radar. It consisted of 8 Freya class antenna arranged in a 4 x 2 configuration. It measured 25 meters wide and ten meters high and was mounted on four pylons fixed in concrete. Some installations had a second array mounted back-to-back. Each array could be electronically swung through about 100 degrees, so the dual sided array could look behind itself to continue to track bombers as they flew into Germany. Frequency was the same as Freya (125 MHz). Range was up to 300 km with a transmit power of 200 kW. Installations being very large took up to four months to build.

FuMG 402 Wassermann: This system was deployed in 1942. It was basically six Freya antenna mounted on a rotation cylinder. Frequencies were similar to Freya (125 MHz) transmit power was 100 kW, resulting in a usable range of approx 200 km. Three main versions were produced with sub variants in each class.

Wassermann L: The original light version. Some sources indicate that it had structural problems.

Wassermann S: The heavy version. First deployed late 1942 Some sources indicate it had more than six arrays.

Wassermann M: The last family were the medium class units. Again, it is not clear exactly how many Freya arrays were attached to the mast. In 1944, this version received a modification that allowed it to electronically tilt its beams by 16 degrees which allowed it to perform height determination turning it into a 3D search radar.

Elefant & See Elefant: These bi-static radars were an attempt to combine jamming resistance with long range. They operated in two bands 23–28 MHz or 32–38 MHz. Range was approximately 400 km but under certain RF conditions much greater ranges were obtained. Antenna were usually mounted on Wassermann towers (all units differed in detail from each other). Three Elefants were in operation at the end of the war with one See Elefant. Sources are unclear what the difference between the two types were.

== Panoramic search ==
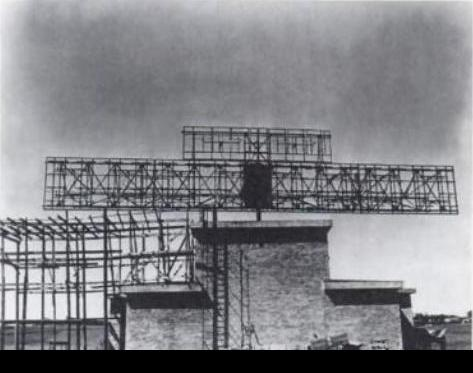
FuMG 404 captured in 1945 still in construction.

The first type of early-warning radar set giving a panoramic display which come into operation is usually referred to as the Jagdschloss, although its official designation is Jagdschloss F, to distinguish it from later types, such as the Michael B and Z.

Jagdschloss F: The antenna was 24 m wide and 3 m high, consisting of sixteen pairs of double horizontal transmit and receive dipoles. Above this, an 8.5 metre wide antenna array of eight vertical dipoles was mounted for the IFF.The first 62 Jagdschloss were of the Voll Wismar type using wide band antenna covering the band 1.90-2.20 metres. Another 18, used the band 1.20–1.90 meters. Range was 100 km. An optional feature known as Landbriefträger (Postman) was a remote PPI display for use with Jagdschloss. This allowed the PPI display from the radar station to be sent simultaneously to command HQ by HF cable, or by a UHF radio link.

Jagdschloss Michael B: A ponderous aerial array of two rows of eighteen Würzburg mirrors measuring 56 metres long x 7 metres high was used in the Würzmann experimental early-warning radar, and formed the serial array for Jagdschloss Michael B with the array in a horizontal position. The wavelength employed, was that of a Voll Wismar 53.0-63.8 cm. Range approx 250 km. None may have entered service, though one source mentions one entering service.

Forsthaus F: This system was a development of the Jagdschloss Michael B using the so-called Euklid 25–29 cm. waveband employed by the Navy. Once more a very long aerial array 48 metres long and about 8 metres high was used, employing a cylindrical paraboloid. A wave guide antenna (Hohlraumstrahler) was placed along the focal line with a second and a third wave guide parallel to it above and below respectively. Range was expected to be over 200 km. Probably none completed.

Forsthaus KF: Development of the Forsthaus F. Reduced in size so that the system would fit in a railway carriage. Antenna 24 meters long. Range 120 km.

Dreh Freya: This set, which was also known as Freya Panorama, was first introduced in June 1944. It consisted of a Freya aerial of the Breitband type working in Bereich I (1.90-2.50), the frequency of which could be adjusted at will. The aerial was so built that it rotated through 360° and gave a remote panoramic presentation. About 20 units were in use in January 1945. The range claimed for it was only about 100 km.

Jagdhütte:This apparatus, which was produced by Siemens, gave a panoramic PPI display of the German IFF responses, using 24- or 36-metre rotating aerials. The wavelength employed was 2.40 metres and it was planned, with its aid, to trigger off the FuGe 25A. In this way, friendly fighters were to be controlled from the ground at ranges up to about 300 km. It was fully realised that if the FuGe 25A frequency was ever jammed the Jagdhütte would be useless, but it was not considered likely that the Allies would attempt to jam it. Small numbers may have been completed at the end of the war.

Jagdwagen: Jagdwagen was designed as a mobile panoramic radar to control fighters at close ranges immediately behind the front. It was a project of the firm of Lorenz. The aerials were considerably smaller than the Jagdhütte, the array being only 8 metres long. The aerial array was to be mounted on the Kumbach stand as used in the Egerland Flak set. The frequency band used was that of the ASV set Hohentwiel namely 53–59 cm. Range 40–60 km. Prototypes only.

Jagdhaus (FuMG 404): Jagdhaus was designed and built by Lorenz in 1944 as an early warning radar. It was the most powerful radar built by the Germans, with a peak pulse power of 300 kW, which Lorenz planned to increase to 750 kW. The whole assembly was the size of a house, which is possibly how it got its name (‘haus’ being the German for ‘house’). The rotating upper part of the construction housed the separate parabolic transmit and receive antennae and reflectors, with the IFF above them as usual. It weighed 48 tons and rotated at 10 rpm. It operated on wavelengths of 1.4 to 1.8 metres, and had a range of about 300 km. It could measure altitude, azimuth and range. The control room was located below the antennae, from which its PPI image was also transmitted to command HQ at Charlottenberg by Landbrieftrager, similar to the Jagdschloss system. It is believed that only one Jagdhaus was constructed, which fell into Soviet hands when it was captured by their troops in 1945, during which time it was damaged. The Soviets compelled the Germans to repair it and instruct them in its operation.

== Aircraft intercept ==
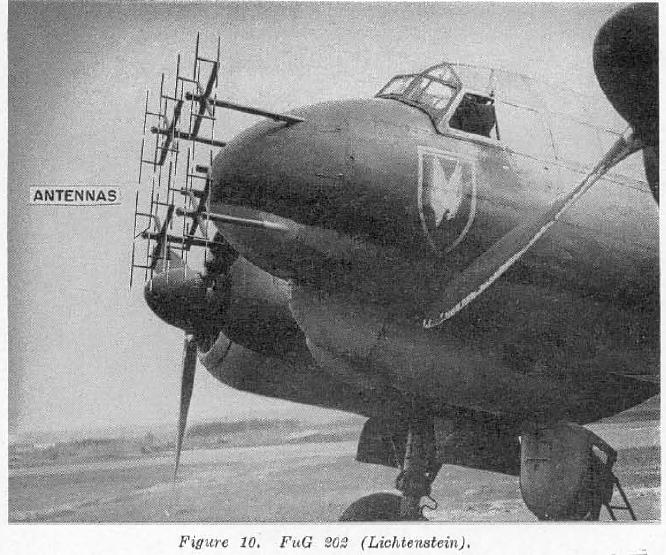
Lichtenstein B/C FuG 202 with 32-dipole "mattress" aerials

Lichtenstein B/C - FuG 202: Low-UHF band frequency range, introduced in 1941 it was the initial AI radar. Deployed in large numbers with 32-dipole element Matratze (mattress) antenna arrays, it operated on the 61 cm wavelength. Its range was (in theory) 2–3 km but in practise was found to be dependent on factors such as height. Compromised to the Allies on May 9, 1943.

Lichtenstein C-1 - FuG 212: Introduced in 1943, this was an improved version of the FuG 202.

Lichtenstein SN2 - FuG 220: Low-mid VHF band frequency range, introduced in 1943 in response to Allied jamming, and used an eight-dipole Hirschgeweih (a stag's antlers) antenna array. Transmitter power of 2 kW on 3.3 meters. Range was increased to 6 km. Minimum range was 400 m, which was found to be a problem, hence aircraft carried it and FuG202. Later versions did away with the need for the Fug 202. Compromised to the Allies in July 1944.

Lichtenstein SN3 - FuG 228: A higher-powered version of the SN2. Range increased to 8 km. Only a small number accepted into service, perhaps only prototypes.

FuG 214 : This was an "add-on" unit to the SN2 which gave it an additional, rear-facing antenna installation. This was in response to Allied night fighters accompanying the bomber streams to hunt the German night fighters while they hunted the bombers. The idea was to prevent Allied fighters attacking the German fighters from behind.

Neptun 1 - FuG 216: A small number of experimental sets fitted to Fw 190 and Bf 109. Wavelength 1.3 to 1.8 meters.

Neptun 2 - FuG 217: A small number of sets fitted to Fw 190 and Bf 109. 1.6 to 1.8 meters wavelength. Some had a rear warning component.

Neptun 3 - Fug 218: A replacement for SN2, deployed late 1944 after SN2 was jammed. Wavelength 1.6 to 1.9 meters, most often using same, eight-dipole "stag's antlers" antenna array with shorter dipole elements. Range up to 5 km. Some were fitted to Me 262 to create night fighters that could catch Mosquito intruders.

Neptun 4 - FuG 219: Increased power version of the FuG218, experimental sets only.

Berlin A - FuG 224: The first centimetric (3 GHz) band radar. Based on a captured H2S radar unit, codenamed "Rotterdams". Unknown number built but under 100. Range 5K under ideal conditions, 10 cm wavelength.

Berlin N1 - FuG 240 N: Combination of the Berlin A and the SN2. Only small numbers delivered.

Berlin N2: Increased power Berlin N, Range reported to be 9K.

Berlin N3/N4: Experimental units.

Bremen - FuG 244: (also known as Berlin D) Berlin A with the frequency changed to 3 cm (10 GHz) rather than 9 cm. Experimental.

Bremen O - FuG 245: Another experiments 3 cm unit.

== Air-to-surface search ==
Neptun: Early system - It failed its acceptance tests - the system was later reworked into an aircraft intercept set.

Hohentwiel (FuG 200); UHF-band radar, operated at wavelength between 52 and 57 cm. Range was between 10 km for a small vessel like a surfaced submarine to 70 km for a large ship. Under the best circumstances it could see the coast at approx 150 km. It had separate antennae for transmit and receive. The transmit antenna was centrally mounted, pointing forward, while the two receive antennae were mounted either side, pointing outwards by 30 degrees, giving it a search beam width of about 120 degrees. Each antenna array consisted of sixteen horizontally polarised dipoles, mounted in four groups of four in a vertical stack.

A variant of the Hohentwiel the Tiefentwiel (FuMG407); was tried as an Air Surveillance radar on the coast to try and detect low flying aircraft.

== Naval surface search - land based - Seetakt ==
FuMO 1 - Calis A: Its 6.2 x 2.5m antenna consisted of 2 rows of eight full wave vertical dipoles. Its wavelength was 82 cm and its range depended on the height it was installed above sea level, but typically was about 15–20 km. Given the frequency low angle reflections from the surface, also known a clutter would have been an issue.

FuMO 2 - Calis B: Improved version of the FuMO 1 - similar clutter problems but improved transmitter and accuracy.

FuMO 3 - Zerstorersaule: A version of the destroyer radar modified for land use.

FuMO 4 - Dunkirchen : Improved version of the FuMo 2 - similar otherwise

FuMO 5 - Boulogne: Yet another improved version of the FuMO 2 - increased transmitter power again with an improved aerial - usable range now 40 – 50 km.

FuMO 11 - Renner: 3M antenna from a Wurzburg combined with a 9 cm "Berlin" unit and mounted on a Seetakt base optimized for sea search rather than air search. Sources differ on usable range.

FuMO 12 & 13: Improved Renner units to attempt to compensate for poor reliability with the original unit.

FuMO 15 - Sheer: Combination of a Berlin 9 cm and an Antenna from a Giant Wurzburg - seems to have been optimized for surface search in the same was as the Renner series was.

FuMO 51 - Mammut G: Version of the Luftwaffe FuMO401 but with Seetakt antenna and waveforms to optimise it for surface search rather than air search.

FuMO 214 - Giant Wurzburg: Naval designation for the airforce unit.

FuMO 215 See Reise: Improved FuMO 214

== Naval air search - land based - Flugmeldung ==
FuMO 52: Naval designation for the FuMG 401 Mammut C.

FuMO 64 : A version of the Hohentwiel L ASV radar modifier for coastal air search - different from the unsuccessful xxx

FuMO 221: Naval designation for the FuMG 64 Mannheim.

FuMO 301 - 303: Versions of the FuMG 39-41 Freya

FuMO 311 - 318: Versions of the Freya working on other frequencies (Around 2.2 Meters) from the normal Freya. Sometimes known as the Freiburg

FuMO 321 - 328: Based on the fuMO311 family of units but working at 1.5 meters.

FuMO 331: Naval designation for the FuMG 402 Wassermann M

FuMO 371: Naval designation for the FuMG 403 Jagdschloss

== Naval flak direction - land based - Flakziel ==
FuMO 201: Flakleit - Using Seetakt 80 cm technology a 3D radar mounted on an underground armoured turret (originally an optical rangefinder) small numbers produced. Multiple antenna. Manufactured by GEMA.

FuMO 211 - 213: Naval designation for the FuMG 62 family or radars - the Wurzburg A, C & D.

FuMO 215: See Reise.

FuMO 221: Mannheim.

== Naval coastal battery fire control - Seeart ==
FuMO 111: Barbara, 9 cm fire control radar based on modifying a FuMO 15 Giant Wurzburg to operate at 9 cm. Only experimental radars produced.

FuMO 214: A Wurzburg Reise reconfigured for use as a naval radar with a range of approximately 50 – 70 km against surface targets.

FuMO 215: Improved range version of the FuMO214.

== Centimeter radars ==
Although the Germans were carrying out research at centimeter wavelengths at the start of the war, the work was abandoned as it was decided that the war would be over before the research and development could be completed. In February 1943 an RAF Stirling bomber was shot down over Rotterdam and a damaged H2S system was recovered. The Germans started a crash development program to use the information deduced from the captured system. Although a range of prototypes were produced, very few reached front line troops. Due to the device being recovered near Rotterdam, the Germans used that name in several code names for the Centimeter (9 cm) systems, such as "Rotterdam Device".

Rotterdam: To get the quickest start with development, German industry copied, as far as possible, the H2S system. Approximately 20 systems were manufactured for R&D work. They led to the Roderich jammer and the Berlin & Korfu receivers.

Jagdschloss Z: The 9 cm version of the Jagdschloss F panoramic radar system. Prototypes only.

Forsthaus Z: The 9 cm version of the Forsthaus panoramic search radar. Prototypes only.

FuMG 77: Rotterheim. A combination of the 9 cm receiver/transmitter of the Berlin system with the antenna and other systems from a Mannheim. Its range was about 30 km and it was found to be unaffected by Allied jamming. Its name changed to Marbach V later in the war.

FuMG 76: Marbach. A combination of the Berlin transmitter/receiver with the Ansback 4.5 meter reflector and systems. Controlled by the "Michael" remote control system. Sources suggest that three systems were completed.

FuMG 74: Kulmbach. A 9 cm panoramic search radar, 6 meter antenna and remote controlled like the FuMG76. When combined with that radar it was known as the Egerland system. Only two were completed, with a range of approx 50 km.

== Passive search ==
FuG 221 Freya-Halbe: This was a Freya modified to locate British airborne jammers. Development completed but due to lack of parts never deployed.

FuG 221 Rosendahl: This was a Freya modified to locate British bombers by tracking their Monica warning radar emissions. By the time development was completed the British had ceased using Monica, so never deployed

FuG 223: A family of passive airborne receivers tuned to various radar bands such as Freya and Würzburg. Designed to allow night fighters to home onto bombers fitted with jammers against those radars. The Fug223 was a version build from surplus FuG 227 components that detected reflected energy from an aircraft being illuminated by a ground radar. In this way it was an example of an early semi-active radar homing system. In order to work it seems that the radar beam had to illuminate the target and the night fighter so that the two receivers could be synchronized. Used by one test and development squadron at the end of the war.

FuG 227 Flensburg: Built using some components from the FuG 220 range of AI equipment. This was a passive device which allowed night fighters to home onto bombers which had their rear warning 'Monica' active. Monica was a short range VHF radar (200 MHz band) which was fitted to the tail of British heavy bombers facing down and back to give the rear turret gunner a warning display. Using this equipment the night fighters could achieve intercept with apparent ease. Extremely effective until the British captured a Junkers Ju 88G-1 night fighter with FuG 227 installed in July 1944, and realised its mode of operation. there after Monica was removed from bombers and FuG 227 ceased to have any value.

Klein Heidelberg was the code-name give to a passive radar system devised in 1941. The system was a bi-static radar system. What was unusual was that the transmitters were British rather than German! The system worked by using the reflections from the Chain Home (British coastal radar system) rather than transmitters associated with the receivers. Klein Heidelberg worked by sensing Chain Home (CH) transmission pulses directly with a small auxiliary antenna, close to the main antenna, whose receiver was tuned to a particular CH station whose exact location, bearing and range was known. The CH signal was then used to synchronise the KH with the CH transmission pulses. The CH pulse started a circular trace on a cathode ray tube (CRT) divided into forty sections. The main antenna received the reflection of these pulses from the target and displayed them on the CRT. Range was between 300 and 600 km. The display was 2D. Resolution was not very good but it allowed the Germans to see bomber formations forming up over England and the general path of the bomber streams. Its big advantage was it was not possible for the British to jam without jamming their own radars. The system entered service in late 1943 and by late 1944 six system were commissioned on the Dutch coast.

FuG 350 Naxos & FuG 351 Korfu: This was a family or radar detectors that operated in the 8 to 12 cm band. They were primarily designed to locate Allied H2S radar transmissions. A range of antenna were used some stationary and some rotating. There were intended to be air, land and maritime versions. However, Naxos had a resolution problem that limited its ability to distinguish individual aircraft. This allowed the night fighter to locate the bomber stream but not usually individual bombers. This was not usually an issue with the maritime based system (primarily U-boats) as there was usually only one aircraft detected at a time. To reduce this issue an improved version the Korfu was developed. It was intended to field Korfu as a replacement for Naxos in all three versions but due to a shortage of components only the land-based version was fielded where is resolution could be used to the best effect.

FuG 350 Naxos Z: The original system, detected H2S radar system on bombers. Unable to distinguish individual bombers nor the 10 GHz H2X Allied bombing radar, but could reliably guide the fighter into the bomber stream.

FuG 350 Naxos ZR: Additional aerials added a tail warning system which allowed British night-fighters to be detected.

FuG 350 Naxos ZX: 3 cm version for detecting allied H2X radars. Not known to have ever been fielded.

FuG 350 Naxos RX: 3 cm version of the Naxos ZR. Not known to have ever been fielded.

FuG 350 Naxos ZD: Combined Z and ZX, allowing 9 cm and 3 cm detection in the same system.

FuG 351 Korfu Z: Entered production late 1944, due to shortage of components only ground-based versions deployed though an airborne version completed development. better range and discrimination than Naxos.

FuG 280 Kiel Z: IR-based passive receiver. 10-degree field of view - display via CRT. Problems with discrimination between fires aircraft and other IR sources.

Falter: Based on the Fug 280 K but detected British IR recognition systems. Development not completed.
