= Sletterhage Lighthouse =

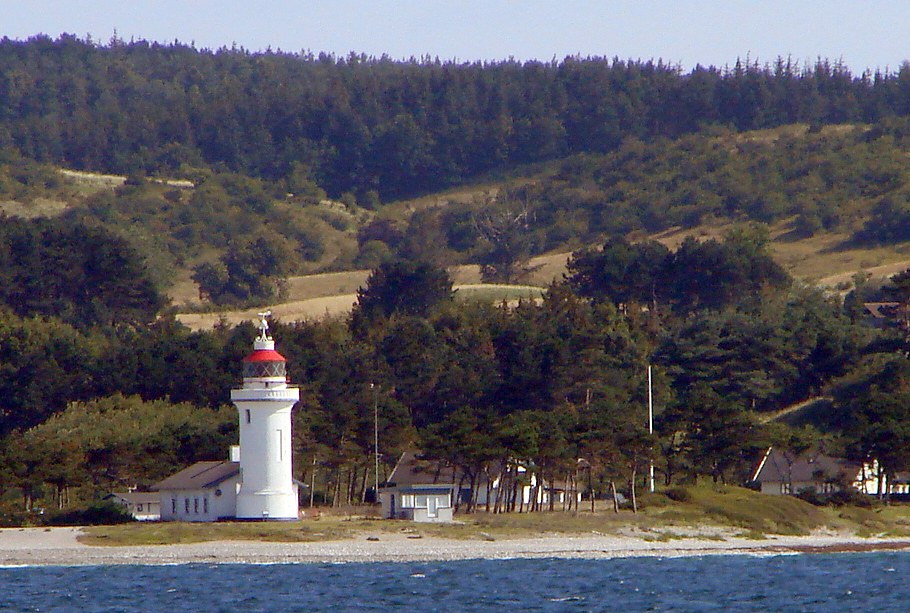
- Sletterhage Lighthouse
- Location: Djursland, Denmark
- Coordinates: 56.095091°N 10.512921°E

Tower
- Constructed: 1872 (first)
- Foundation: concrete
- Construction: concrete tower
- Height: 16 metres (52 ft)
- Shape: cylindrical tower with balcony and lantern attached to 1-story keeper's house
- Markings: white tower and lantern, red lantern roof and trim
- Operator: Sletterhagefyr

Light
- First lit: 1894 (current)
- Focal height: 17 metres (56 ft)
- Characteristic: Oc WRG 10s
- Denmark no.: DFL-2090

Sletterhage Lighthouse is located in Denmark on the southern tip of the Djursland peninsula protruding into the Kattegat between Denmark and Sweden at the entrance to the Baltic Sea. The concrete lighthouse was built in 1894 to help guide ships to and from the Port of Aarhus, via a shipping lane close to the lighthouse isthmus.

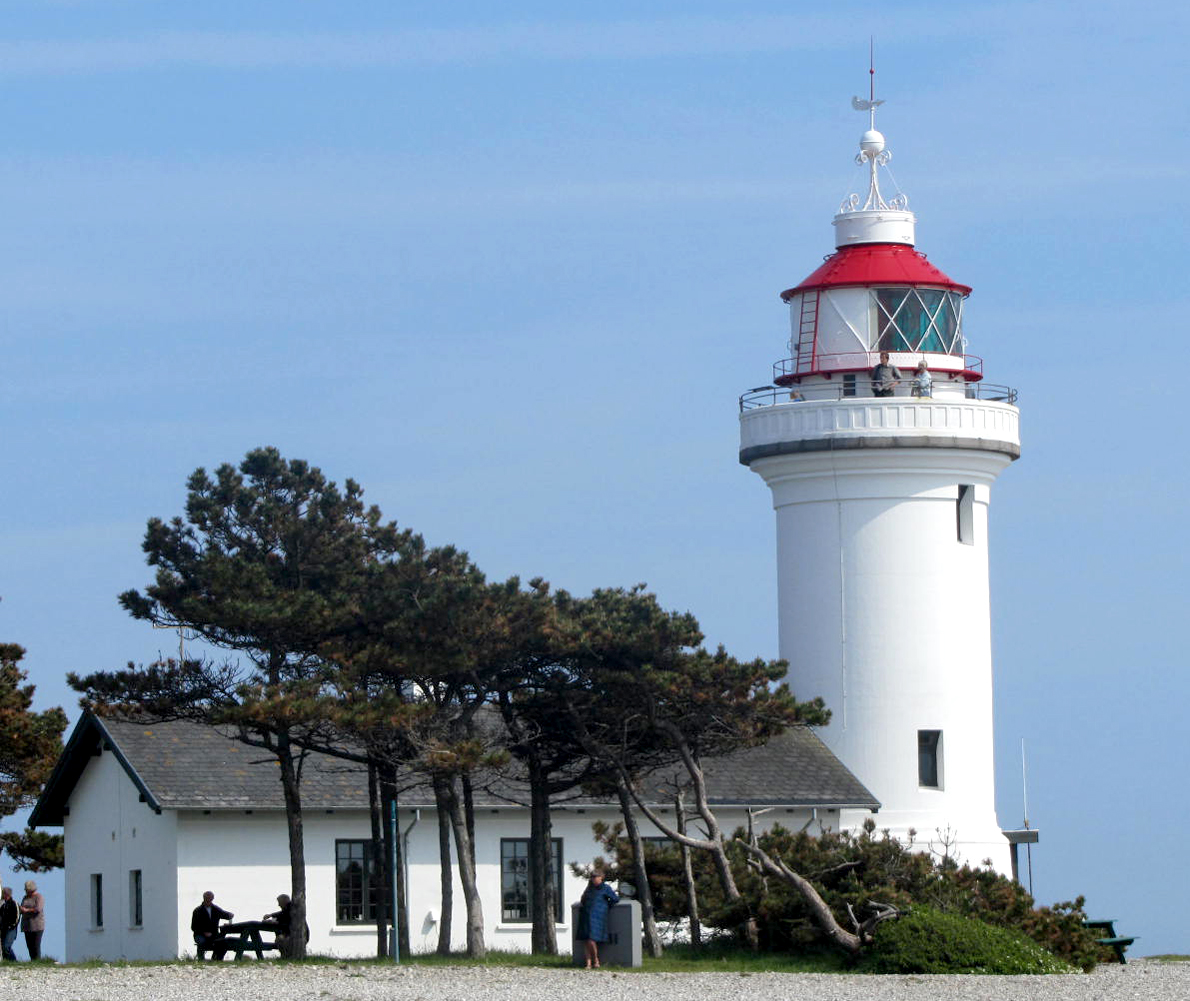
Sletterhage Lighthouse seen from west

After automation, the lighthouse keeper buildings were sold to a private owner. Still, they were reacquired for public use through intervention by Skov- og Naturstyrelsen, the Danish Forest and Nature Agency. Under an agreement with the local Syddjurs municipality, the lighthouse buildings are open to the public and used for exhibitions. On display are themes related to historical and current navigational equipment and principles, marine life, and the geology of the Sletterhage area. The facilities are open to the public in summer including access to the lighthouse tower.

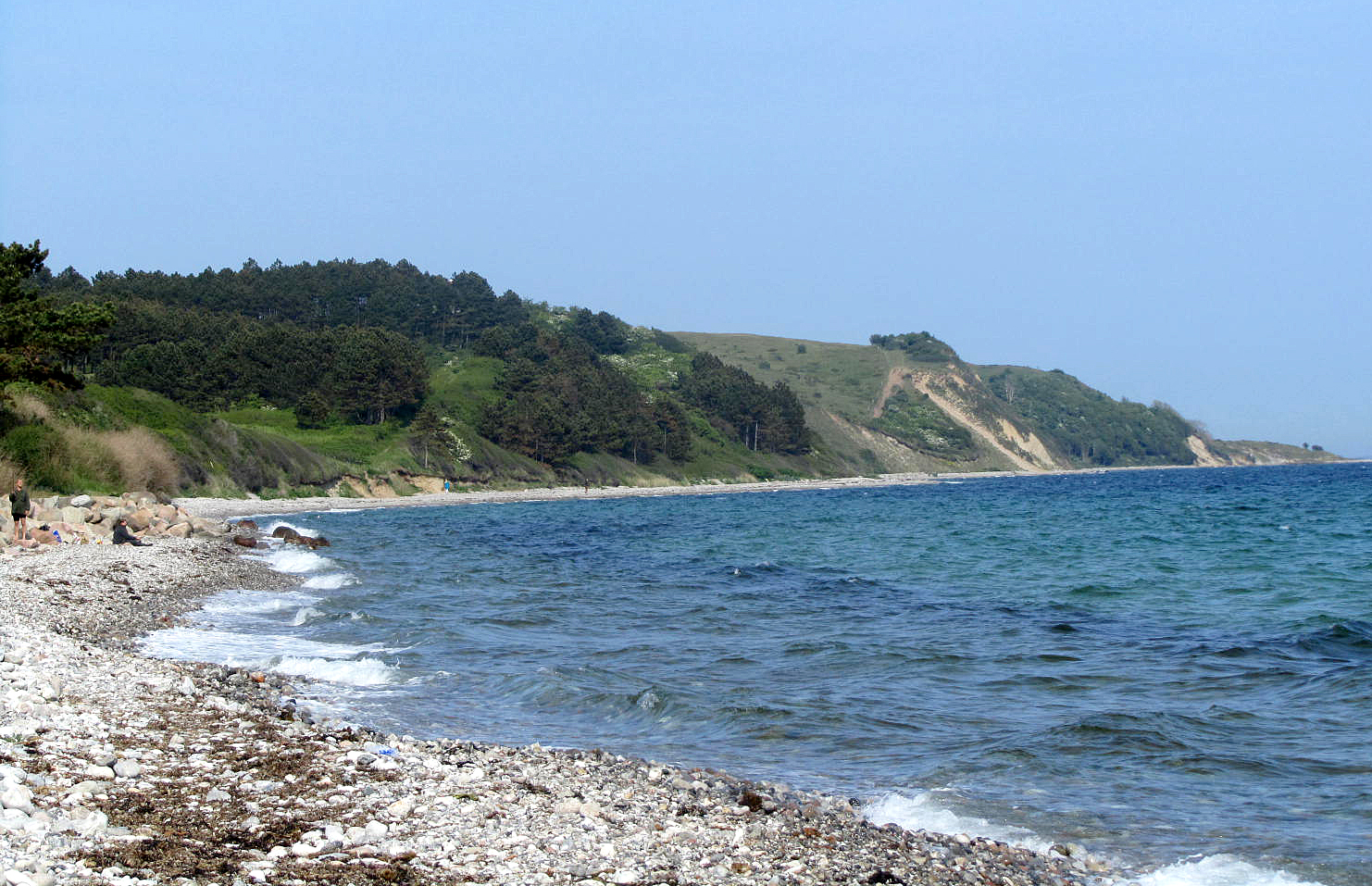
The Bursklint coast stretching northeast from the lighthouse

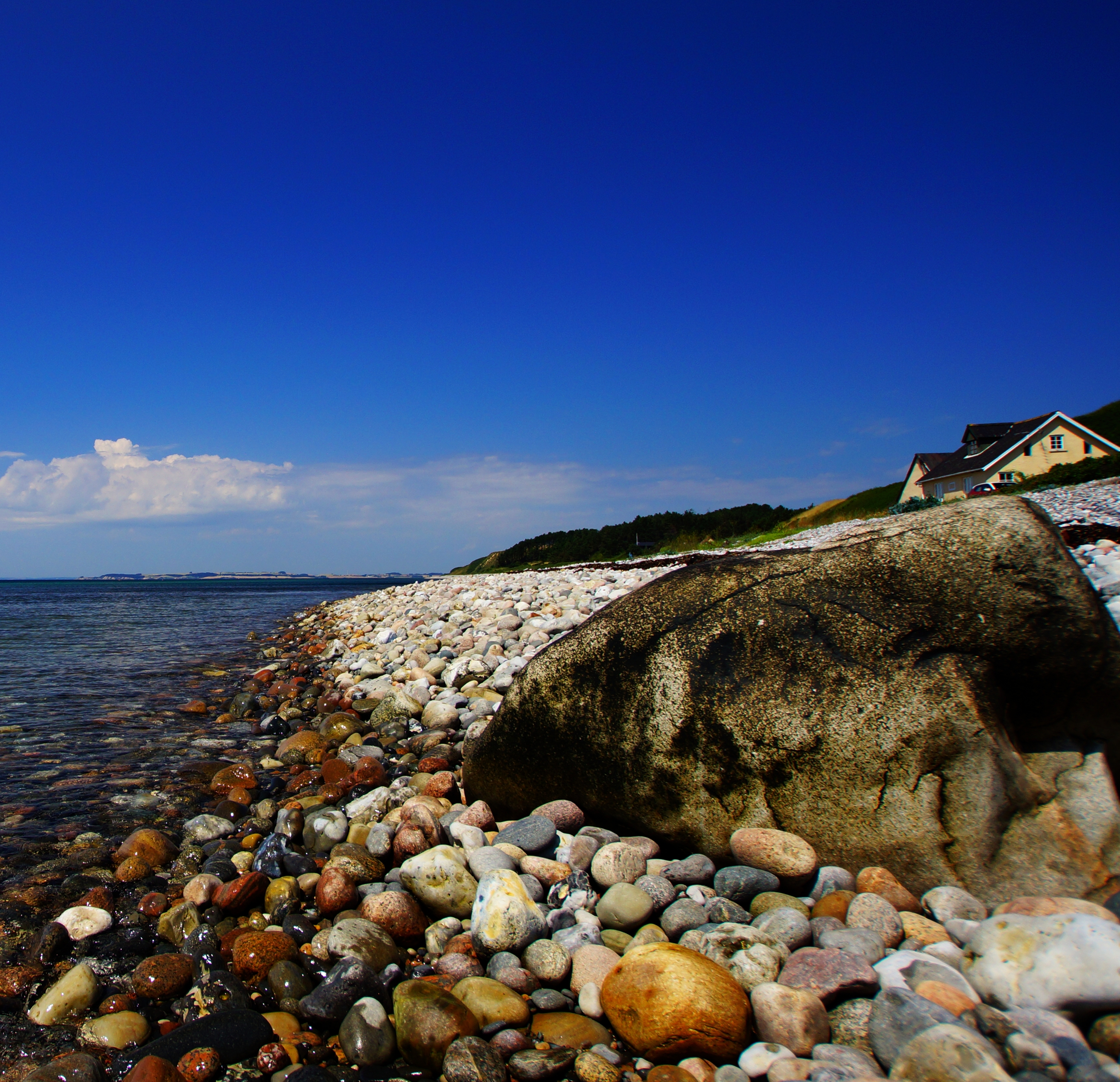
An exhibition at the lighthouse gives a guide to the origin of stones on the beach at Sletterhage, brought here by ice sheet movement. The stones can be traced back to specific extinct volcanoes in Norway and Sweden.

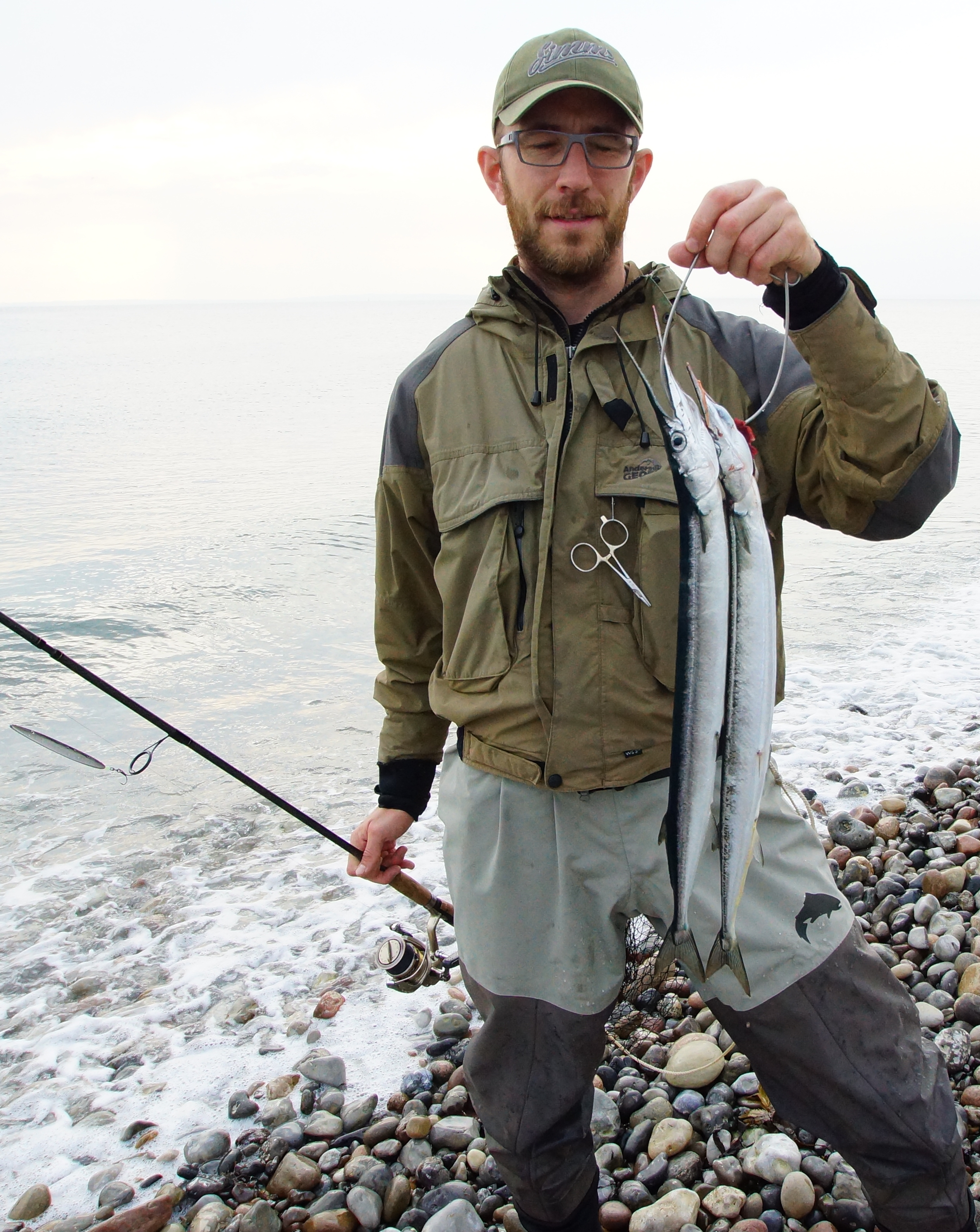
Garfish caught at Sletterhage west of the lighthouse.

Before electrification, the lighthouse had a clockwork mechanism that had to be wound up every four hours to open and close a set of shutters that made the lighthouse flash at specific intervals. Today a 600-watt halogen bulb that turns off and on serves the same function.

The Port of Aarhus built the Sletterhage Lighthouse. Today 7000 - 8000 ships pass the lighthouse to and from the seaport, Aarhus, the second largest town in Denmark. Until 1985 SOK, Søværnets Operative Kommando, the Danish Navy Command, had a monitoring station at the lighthouse, where passing ships were identified.

The geological exhibition at the lighthouse gives an understanding of how ice age glaciers formed Mols Bjerge, the Mols Hills, including the peninsula Helgenæs where the lighthouse is located on the southern tip. Characteristic stones from the beach at Sletterhage are on display. The origin of these different stone types can be traced down to specific prehistoric volcanoes in Norway and Sweden. In this way, the stones on the beach can be used to map ice sheet movements during glaciation periods. The life of the small porpoise whales that are often seen from the coast of Sletterhage is also on display.

The hills, coastline, and sea by the lighthouse attract visitors. Close to the lighthouse is Tyskertårnet, the German Tower, a watchpoint built during WW2 for surveillance of the Kattegat in occupied Denmark. A hill up from the lighthouse, Ellemandsbjerg, 99 meters above sea level is a viewpoint. From here one can see southern Djursland, the Mols Hills, and the eastern coast of Jutland, plus the islands, Tunø, Samsø and Hjelm, as well as the Ebeltoft-peninsula. On a clear day, one can also see Denmark's largest island, Zealand to the southeast. Here Denmark's capital Copenhagen is located. The coast of Sletterhage Lighthouse is visited by anglers and divers. The south-facing hills surrounding the lighthouse have a dry microclimate giving living conditions for several not often seen insects, including some butterfly species.

== See also ==
- List of lighthouses and lightvessels in Denmark
