= RMC Group =

British construction supplies company

RMC Group plc
- Formerly: Ready Mixed Concrete
- Type: Public limited company
- Industry: Concrete
- Founded: 1930
- Defunct: 2005
- Fate: Acquired
- Successor: Cemex
- Headquarters: Egham, Surrey, England

RMC Group plc, formerly Ready Mixed Concrete Limited, was a ready mixed concrete, quarrying and concrete products company headquartered in Egham, England. It was listed on the London Stock Exchange until acquired by Cemex in 2005.

== History ==
Ready Mixed Concrete was founded in 1930 by the Danish civil engineer Kjeld Ammentorp in Bedfont. In 1952, Ready Mixed Concrete of Australia reversed into its UK rival and began to expand. During 1962, the company was listed for the first time on the London Stock Exchange.

In 1979, the company developed Thorpe Park in Staines, Surrey, via the redevelopment of one of its disused quarries as a leisure park once quarrying activity had been completed. Up until 1998, RMC Group operated Thorpe Park, at which point it was sold to The Tussauds Group, owner of Alton Towers and nearby Chessington World of Adventures.

Throughout the early 1990s, RMC Group, akin to its numerous domestic competitors, pursued expansion within the European market. In December 1990, it established a joint venture with Isle of Man Assurance to undertaken land purchases. In September 1995, it was announced that RMC Group would take full control of its German subsidiary paying £356 million to purchase the remaining 36% stake. One year later, the company entered into an unsuccessful bidding war for the Midlands-based aggregates firm Ennemix against the French industrial group Lafarge.

In early 1996, despite a downturn in demand (which was partially attributed to a decrease in road-related work), RMC Group successfully enacted a price rise. Around this time, as a result of recently introduced legislation, RMC Group (along with other British-based aggregates firms) was compelled to diversify into waste management and recycling activities. In 1997, the company reported strong financial results; it also mooted plans to launch a new concrete operation in India.

During August 1998, RMC Group sold its builders' merchant chain, Hall & Co, to Wolseley for £121 million. The firm's fiscal performance continued to be negatively impacted by a downturn in the German market during the latter half of 1998. During early 1999, RMC Group stated that it had held discussions towards the potential acquisition of Scancem AB, although the German firm Heidelberg Materials ultimately emerged as the victor.

In early 2000, the company completed the acquisition of one of its suppliers, the British cement producer Rugby Group for £850 million. This acquisition was stated to achieve £30 million in savings every year. That same year, CEO Peter Young was replaced by Stuart Walker.

During 2005, RMC Group was acquired by Cemex for £2.3 billion; the transaction created the third largest cement producer in the world, behind Lafarge and Holcim.
