= Valdemar Michael Amdrup =

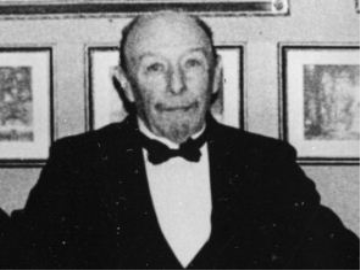
V.M Amdrup

Valdemar Michael Amdrup (1 October 1860 - 11 May 1937) was a Danish lawyer and the second president of the Danish Society for Nature Conservation from 1915 to 21.

== Early life and education ==
Amdrup was born on 1 October 1860, the son of banker Valdemar Amdrup and Line Michaelia Holm. He graduated from Værnedamsvejens Latin- og Realskole in 1878 and completed his law studies (cand. jur.) at the University of Copenhagen in 1884.

== Career ==
Amdryp was a paralegal at Villhelm Lund's law firm from 4 April 1894. He was licensed as an attorney (højesteretssagfører) on 2 June 1888. In 1905–18, he was a judge at the Tiendekommissionen. In 1909 he assumed a position as chief legal officer of Den sjællandske Bondestands Sparekasse. He was a member of the Tax Council for Copenhagen from 1906 and a board member of A/S Sagførernes Auktioner and chairman of A/S American Tobacco Co., A/S, Slangerupbanen, A/S Dunlop Rubber Co. and A/S Højgaard og Schultz.

== Danish Society for Nature Conservation ==
Amdrup was in 1911 one of the driving forces behind the foundation of Danish Society for Nature Conservation. He succeeded Alfred Hage as president of the association in 1915 and was himself succeeded as president by artist Erick Struckmann in 1921 but remained a board member until 1932. With his legal background he was a major influence on the first Danish Nature Conservation Act of 1917.

== Honours ==
Amdrup was made a Knight in the Order of the Dannebrog in 1906 and he was awarded the Cross of Honour in 1937.

== Personal life ==
Amdrup married public school teacher Mathilde Caroline Koefoed (9 October 1859 - 16 December 1915), a daughter of Sandemand Absalon Hansen Koefoed and Karen Marie Munck, on 18 July 1890. He owned a summer home in Rågeleje from the early 1910s.

== See also ==
- Georg Carl Amdrup
