= Danish Society for Nature Conservation =

Coordinates: 55.7107°N 12.5729°E

The Danish Society for Nature Conservation, in Danish Danmarks Naturfredningsforening, founded 1911, is an incorporated non-governmental organization based in Denmark. It works for environmental protection and biodiversity, improved environmental legislation, consideration for the natural environment in public planning, and public access to natural resources.

The Society is a member of the International Union for Conservation of Nature. Its name has been translated into English in several different ways, including Danish Nature Preservation Foundation, Danish Society for the Conservation of Nature, and Danish Society for Nature Preservation, but 'Danish Society for Nature Conservation' is the English term which the society uses itself.

== History ==
The Society was founded on 21 April 1911 at the Palace Hotel in Copenhagen as the 'Society for Nature Conservation (Forening for Naturfredning). For many years, its focus was on promoting public access to beaches and forests, particularly to the Øresund Strait and the Jægersborg Deer Park. By 1912 it was campaigning against litter, with the slogan "Sandwich wrappers and eggshells don't look pretty in forest pools!" It also opposed billboards along country roads and campaigned for the maintenance of roadside trees and boulders.

By 1925, the Society had over 3,000 members, and in the same year it changed its name to the Danish Society for Nature Conservation (Danmarks Naturfredningsforening), signifying that it had gained a nationwide status. In 1937, as the result of the intervention of the Danish Prime Minister Thorvald Stauning, the Nature Conservation Act was modified to give the Society a statutory status in conservation matters.

In 1987, the Society's membership peaked at 260,784. However, although competition with similar bodies has now led to a fall to some 140,000 members, it remains the largest nature conservation and environmental organisation in Denmark.

The Society has more than ninety branches and employs a secretariat of some fifty people. Its national offices are at Masnedøgade 20, Copenhagen.

== Publications ==
As well as books and leaflets, the Society publishes the quarterly journal Natur og Miljø ('Nature and Environment'), with a circulation of around 160,000.

== Chairmen ==
- 1911-1915: Alfred Hage (1843-1922), landowner and politician
- 1915-1921: Valdemar Michael Amdrup, lawyer and banker
- 1921-1960: Erick Struckmann (1875-1962), painter
- 1960-1963: Vagn Jensen, senior civil servant in the Ministry of Education

== Presidents ==
- 1963-1984: Valdemar M. Mikkelsen, Professor of Botany at the Royal Veterinary and Agricultural University
- 1984-1996: Svend Bichel (born 1943), high school lecturer
- 1996-2006: Poul Henrik Harritz (born 1956), journalist
- 2006-2018: Ella Maria Bisschop-Larsen (born 1951), biologist
- 2018-2026 : Maria Reumert Gjerding (born 1978), environmental planner and politician

== See also ==
- Danish Organisation for Renewable Energy
- Danish Forest and Nature Agency
- Directorate of State Forestry (Denmark)
- List of national parks of Denmark
- Wind power in Denmark
