= Albert Edvard Wang =

Danish landscape painter

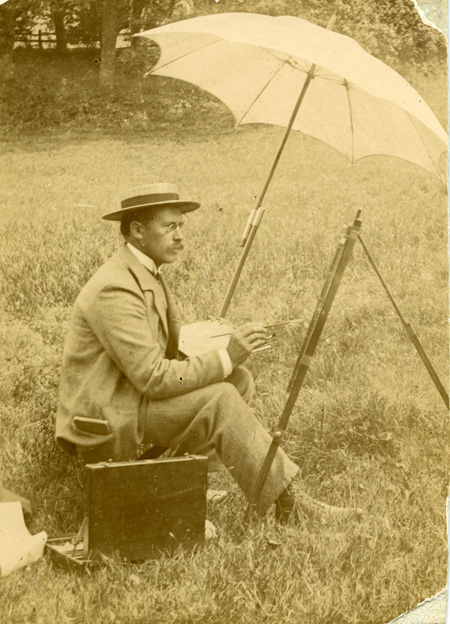
- Albert Wang painting at Palsgaard on 21 August 1896
- Born: 1 September 1864; Horsens, Austrian Empire
- Died: 19 December 1930 (aged 66); Hellerup, Denmark
- Known for: Painter

Albert Edvard Wang (1 September 1864 – 19 December 1930) was a Danish landscape painter.

== History ==
Wang was born on 1 September 1864 in Horsens, the son of merchant Søren Monberg Wang and Ane Cathrine Borg. He completed an apprenticeship as a building painter in his home town in 1882 but aspired to become an artist. He therefore enrolled at the Artists' Independent Art Schools in Copenhagen where he studied under Peder Severin Krøyer and Kristian Zahrtmann in 1886–1889.

== Career ==
=== Landscape painting ===
Wang specialized in landscape painting and painted his way through most of Denmark, although the countryside between Horsens and Juelsminde and North Zealand feature most prominently in his work. He has also painted in Norway.

Wang was represented on many exhibitions, including the Charlottenborg Spring Exhibitions between 1889 and 1911.

=== Åpstcards ===
Wang was one of Denmark's first artists to collaborate with publishers of postcards. They include a series of wide cartoons with romantic landscapes from most parts of Denmark. Most of the real postcards date from the period between 1898 and 1910 and were printed with the text "Hilsen fra Danmark" ("Greetings from Denmark").

== Personal life ==
Wang blev married Katrine Linca Jørgensen on 6 May 1892 in Copenhagen. They lived in Hellerup and also owned a summer house in Rågeleje from the early 1910s.

Wang died on 19 December 1930 in Hellerup and is buried at the Cemetery of Holmen.
