= Directorate of State Forestry (Denmark) =

The Directorate of State Forestry (Danish: Direktoratet for Statsskovbruget) was created by Law 134 on May 13, 1911. It replaced the previous overførsterinspektorater and forest steward districts. Its duties consisted primarily of management of the Danish state forests.

On June 19, 1975, the Directorate of State Forestry became the Forest Service (Danish: Skovstyrelsen), which in 1987 changed its name to the Forest and Nature Agency (Danish: Skov- og Naturstyrelsen).

== See also ==
- Danish Forest and Nature Agency
