= Cerhonice =

- Municipality
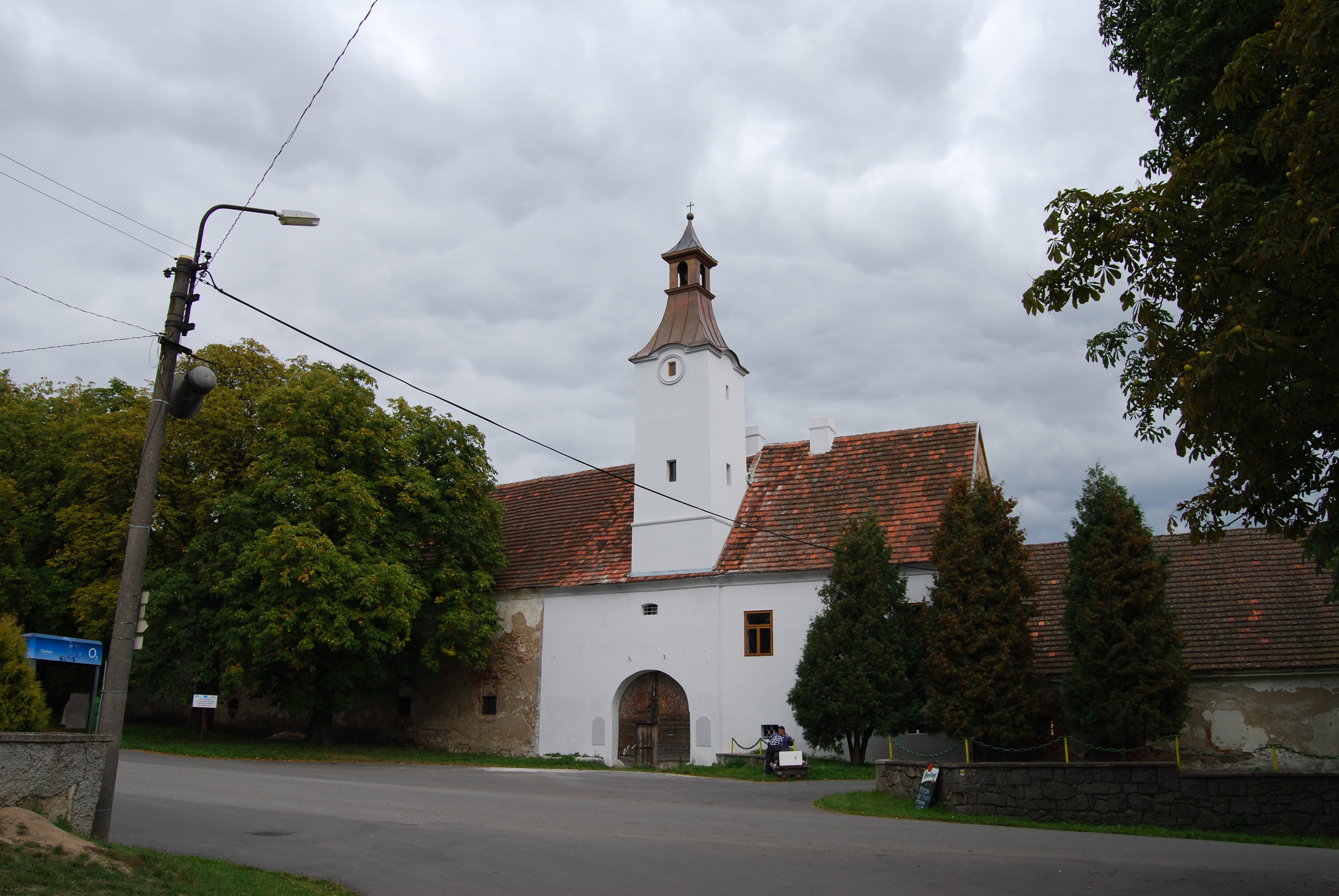
- Cerhonice Castle

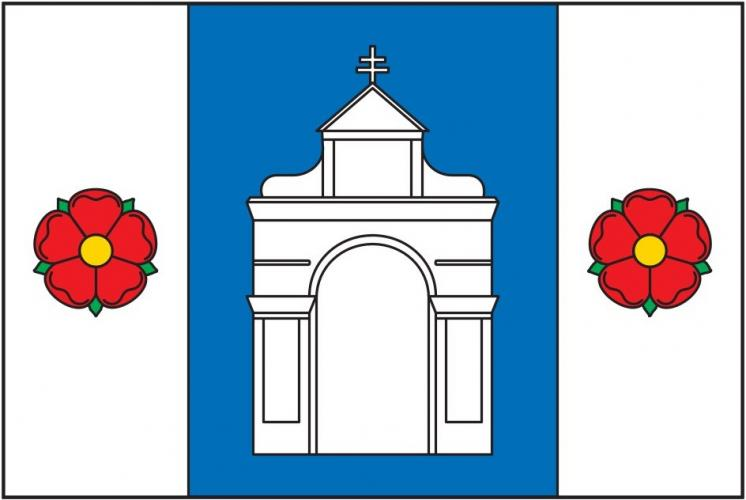
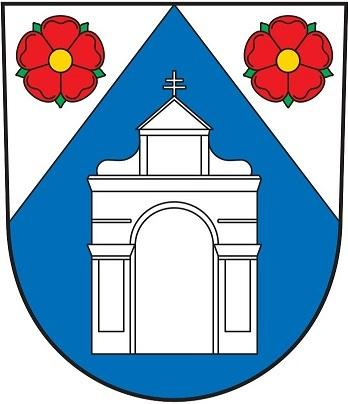
- Flag Coat of arms

- Location in the Czech Republic
- Coordinates: 49°25′5″N 14°3′20″E
- Country: Czech Republic
- Region: South Bohemian
- District: Písek
- First mentioned: 1291

Area
  - Total: 9.51 km^{2} (3.67 sq mi)
- Elevation: 450 m (1,480 ft)

Population (2026-01-01)
  - Total: 145
  - Density: 15.2/km^{2} (39.5/sq mi)
- Time zone: UTC+1 (CET)
  - Summer (DST): UTC+2 (CEST)
- Postal code: 398 04
- Website: www.cerhonice.cz

Cerhonice is a municipality and village in Písek District in the South Bohemian Region of the Czech Republic. It has about 100 inhabitants.

Cerhonice lies approximately 15 kilometres (9 mi) north-west of Písek, 58 km (36 mi) north-west of České Budějovice, and 79 km (49 mi) south of Prague.

== Administrative division ==
Cerhonice consists of two municipal parts (in brackets population according to the 2021 census):

- Cerhonice (120)
- Obora u Cerhonic (32)

== Demographics ==
Historical population
Year	Pop.	±%
1869	716	—
1880	716	+0.0%
1890	659	−8.0%
1900	648	−1.7%
1910	629	−2.9%
1921	671	+6.7%
1930	588	−12.4%
1950	508	−13.6%
1961	446	−12.2%
1970	327	−26.7%
1980	233	−28.7%
1991	151	−35.2%
2001	127	−15.9%
2011	134	+5.5%
2021	152	+13.4%
Source: Censuses
