= Danish Nature Agency =

Coordinates: 55.7066°N 12.5534°E

The Danish Nature Agency (Danish: Naturstyrelsen) is part of the Ministry of Environment (Danish: Miljøministeriet), and deals with a number of tasks in nature conservation and forestry. In addition, the agency is in charge of operation and administration of the state-owned forests and the rest of Miljøministeriet's areas. The agency advises the Secretary of State and the Government, and administers Danish planning law as to what makes it into the state's center for regional planning. The Forest and Nature Agency's sphere of operation is determined by Order nr. 963 as of 21 September 2004 and Order nr. 1485 as of 20 December 2005.

== Objectives ==
- The agency aims for a balanced development throughout the country
- It is responsible for maintaining and restoring a diverse countryside
- It seeks to strike a balance between nature and industry

== Values ==
In 2005 the Nature Agency re-examined its values, and the management and staff have chosen five values as benchmark agency working methods:

- Reliability based on professional competence, accountability, and honesty
- Drive, i.e. the ability to transform knowledge into action
- Cooperation, i.e. the agency's staff are responsive and cooperative partners for all interested parties
- Job satisfaction though good opportunities for development and participation
- Kindness to customers and the staff themselves

== State Forest Districts ==
As of 1 January 2007, the 19 districts into which the Danish state forests are divided were called State Forest Districts (Danish: Statsskovdistrikter). The State Forest Districts were all overseen by the Forest and Nature Agency.

State forest areas include, in addition to forests, lakes, streams, bogs, meadows, beaches, dunes and heaths.

The total state forest area is 192,000 ha (1,920 km^{2}), i.e. about 4% of Denmark's land. About 109,000 ha (1.090 km^{2}) of the land is wooded.

On 1 January 2008, the State Forest Districts were replaced by 19 local units. The 19 local units are:

- Blåvandshuk
- Bornholm
- Fyn
- Himmerland
- Hovedstaden
- Kronjylland
- Midtjylland
- Nordsjælland
- Storstrøm
- Søhøjlandet
- Sønderjylland
- Thy
- Trekantsområdet
- Vadehavet
- Vendsyssel
- Vestjylland
- Vestsjælland
- Øresund
- Østsjælland

== See also ==
- Directorate of State Forestry
- Danish Organisation for Renewable Energy
- Danish Society for Nature Conservation

== External sources and references ==
- Danish Forest and Nature Agency homepage
- Interactive map with protected areas in Denmark
