= Kjeld Ammentorp =

Danish businessman (1895–1975)

- Born: 10 November 1895; Frederiksberg in Denmark
- Died: 23 October 1975 (aged 79); Gentofte
- Occupation: Founder of RMC Group

Kjeld Anker Ammentorp (10 November 1895 – 23 October 1975) was the founder of RMC Group, one of the United Kingdom's largest concrete businesses.

== Career ==
Born in Frederiksberg in Denmark, Kjeld Ammentorp moved to the United Kingdom in 1919. A civil engineer by training, Ammentorp took advantage of the invention of self-agitating cement trucks in the 1920s. He built his first plant in 1930 at Bedfont in London, bought cement mixers from Denmark and expanded his business into one of the largest in the United Kingdom.

In 1952 he sold his company to Sam Stirling who had developed a similar business in Australia. Ammentorp remained on the board of the company until 1958 but retired to Denmark in 1961.

He died in 1975 at Gentofte and is buried in Frederiksberg.
