= Johan Ammentorp =

Danish medical doctor

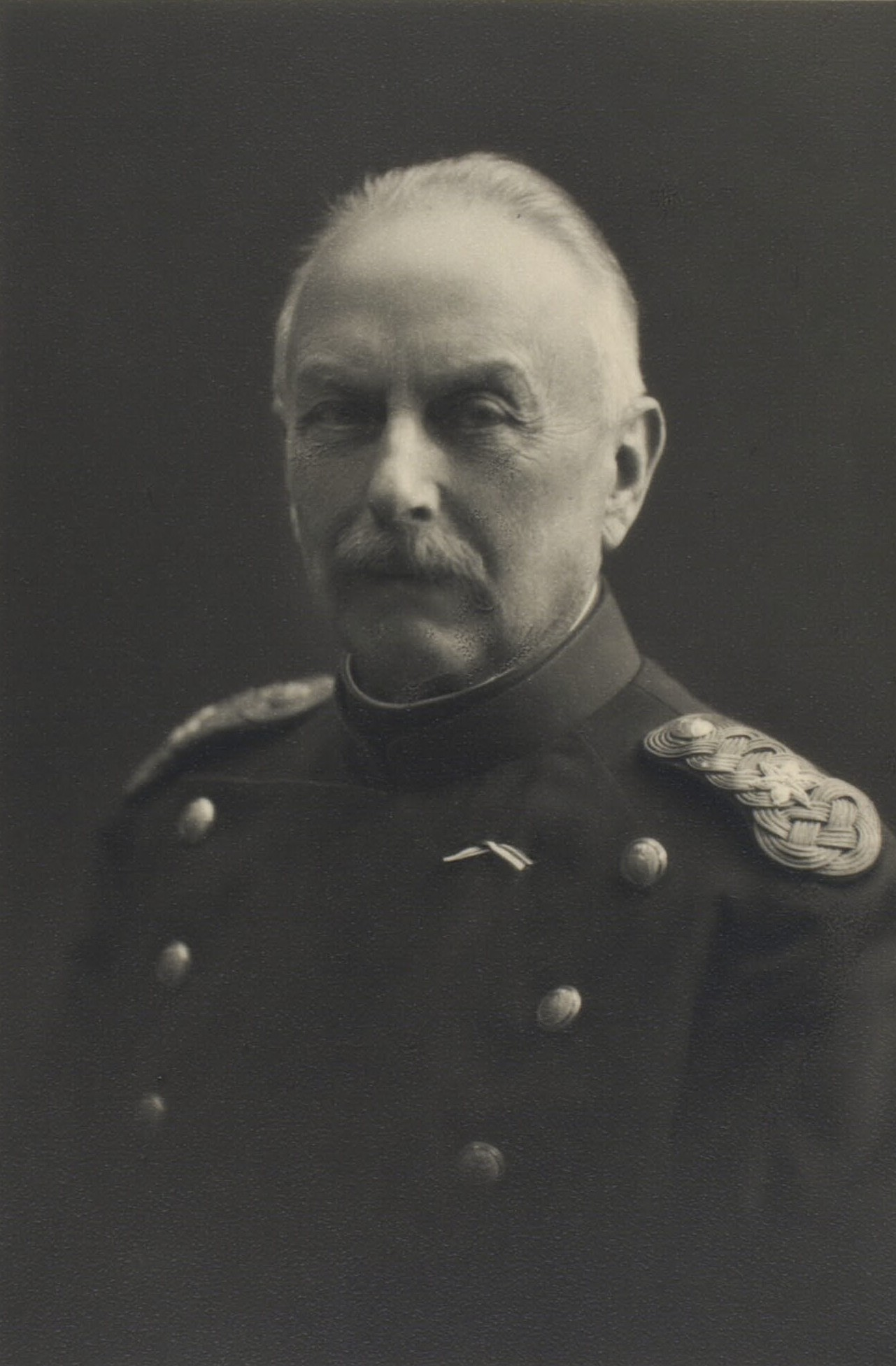
Johan Ludvig Ammentorp

Johan Ludvig Ammentorp (28 October 1860 – 11 June 1931) was a Danish medical doctor. He served as Chief Physician of the Medical Corps (stabslæge) from 1911 and as Physician General (generallæge) from 1916 to 1930.

== Early life and education ==
Ammentorp was born on 28 October 1860 at Hvedholm Castle, the son of Hans Christian Ancher A. (1831–96) and Johanne Petrine Krøyer (1821–94). He was the elder brother of the politician Emil Ammentorp and the paternal uncle of the civil engineer Kjeld Ammentorp. His father leased the Hvedholm estate from its owner Henrik Bille-Brahe.

Ammentorp graduated from Odense Cathedral School in 1879. He graduated in medicine from the University of Copenhagen in 1887.

== Career ==
Ammentorp worked at the Copenhagen Municipal Hospital from 1887 to 1889 and at Frederiks Hospital from 1890 to 1891. He was resident surgeon at the Copenhagen Municipal Hospital's 5th Department from 1891 to 1895. He obtained his doctor's degree (dr. med.) in 1891 for the thesis Den operative Behandling af Cancer recti. He was a resident physician in the Royal Danish Army from 1895 to 1897 and physician at the Copenhagen Fire Department from 1897 to 1916. He joined the Royal Danish Army's Medical Corps in 1897, was appointed as senior physician in 1907 and as Chief Physician of the Medical Corps (stabslæge) in 1911 before finally serving as Physician General (generallæge) from 1916 to 1930.

He was a board member of a number of associations and committees, including the Samfundet for vanføre (b. 1908), Krigsvidenskabeligt selskab (1910–15), the Red Cross (1910–16), Cancerkomiteen (b. 1913) and Antropologisk komité (b. 928). He was for many years president of the Danske lægers hjælpeforening. He instigated the construction of the Military Hospital on Tagensvej in Copenhagen.

== Honours ==
Ammentorp was made a Knight in the Order of the Dannebrog in 1908, a 2nd-rank Commander in 1918 and a 1st-rank Commander in 1925. He was awarded the Cross of Honour in 1915.

== Personal life ==
Ammentorp married Marie Christiane Rasmussen (23 January 1865 – 25 April 1931), a daughter of Peter Rasmussen (c. 1836 – 1912) and Maren Mathiesen (c. 1838 – 81), on 3 December 1895 in Slagelse.
