= AI Mark IV radar =

Operational model of the world's first air-to-air radar system

AI Mk. IV
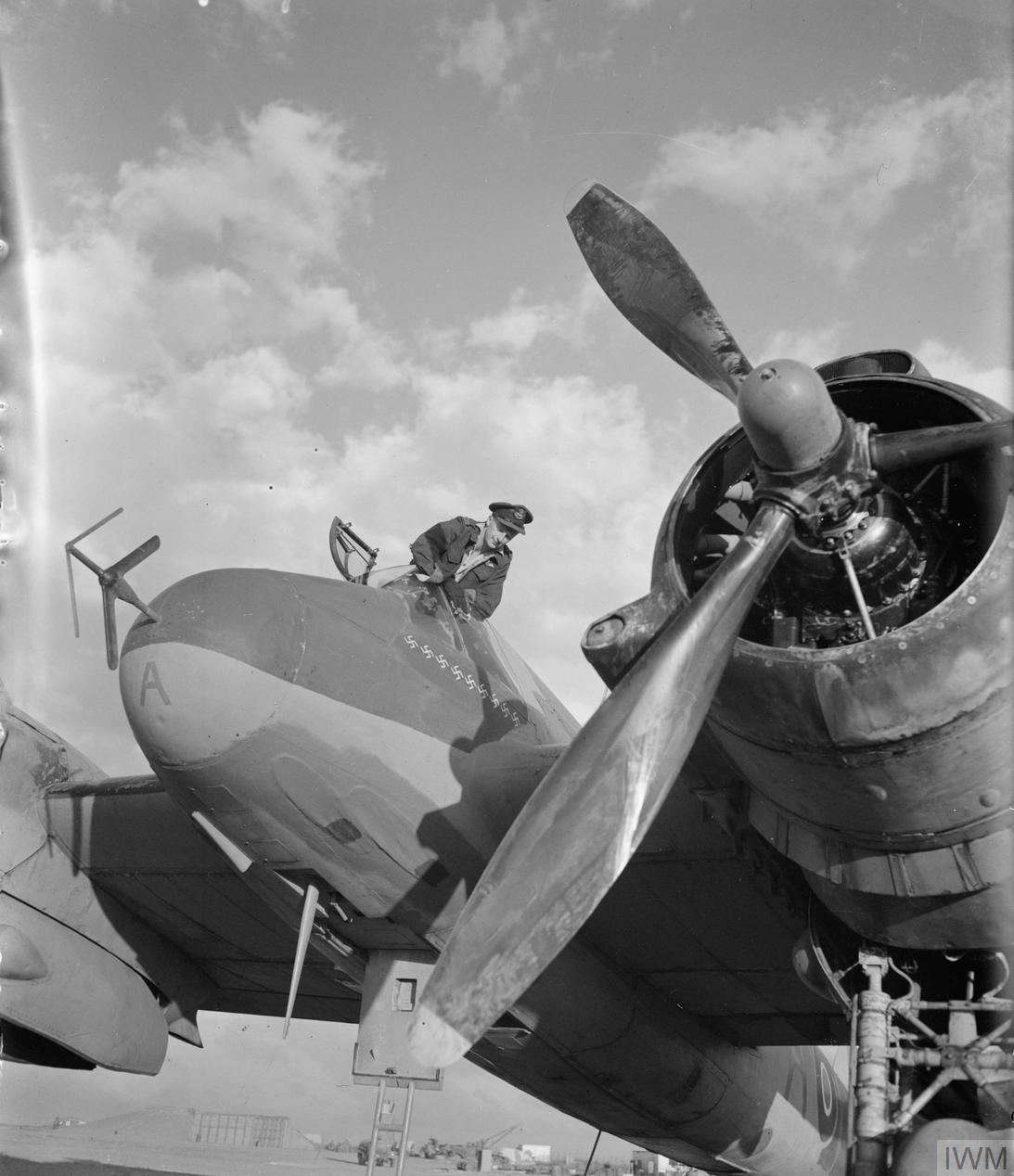
- Group Captain "Paddy" Green achieved most of his 11 confirmed kills in this Mk. IV-equipped Beaufighter.
- Country of origin: UK
- Introduced: 1940
- Type: Aircraft interception
- Frequency: 193 MHz (VHF)
- PRF: 750 pps
- Beamwidth: ~175 degrees
- Pulsewidth: 2.8 μs
- Range: 400–18,000 feet (120–5,490 m)
- Precision: 5 degrees
- Power: 10 kW
- Other names: ARI 5003, SCR-540

Radar, Aircraft Interception, Mark IV (AI Mk. IV), also produced in the USA as SCR-540, was the world's first operational air-to-air radar system. Early Mk. III units appeared in July 1940 on converted Bristol Blenheim light bombers, while the definitive Mk. IV reached widespread availability on the Bristol Beaufighter heavy fighter by early 1941. On the Beaufighter, the Mk. IV arguably played a role in ending the Blitz, the Luftwaffe's night bombing campaign of late 1940 and early 1941.

Early development was prompted by a 1936 memo from Henry Tizard on the topic of night fighting. The memo was sent to Robert Watson-Watt, director of the radar research efforts, who agreed to allow physicist Edward George "Taffy" Bowen to form a team to study the problem of air interception. The team had a test bed system in flights later that year, but progress was delayed for four years by emergency relocations, three abandoned production designs and Bowen's increasingly adversarial relationship with Watt's replacement, Albert Rowe. Ultimately, Bowen was forced from the team just as the system was finally maturing.

The Mk. IV series operated at a frequency of about 193 megahertz (MHz) with a wavelength of 1.5 metres, and offered detection ranges against large aircraft up to 20,000 ft (3.8 mi; 6.1 km). It had numerous operational limitations, including a maximum range that increased with the aircraft's altitude and a minimum range that was barely close enough to allow the pilot to see the target. Considerable skill was required of the radar operator to interpret the displays of its two cathode-ray tubes (CRTs) for the pilot. It was only with the increasing proficiency of the crews, along with the installation of new ground-based radar systems dedicated to the interception task, that interception rates began to increase. These roughly doubled every month through the spring of 1941, during the height of the Blitz.

The Mk. IV was used operationally for only a short period. The introduction of the cavity magnetron in 1940 led to rapid progress in microwave-frequency radars, which offered far greater accuracy and were effective at low altitudes. The prototype Mk. VII began to replace the Mk. IV at the end of 1941 and AI Mk. VIII largely relegated the Mk. IV to second-line duties by 1943. The Mk. IV's receiver, originally a television receiver, was used as the basis of the ASV Mk. II radar, Chain Home Low, AMES Type 7, and many other radar systems throughout the war.

== Development ==
=== Genesis ===
By late 1935, Robert Watt's (Note: Watt added Watson to his name in 1942, becoming Robert Watson-Watt.) development of what was then known as Range and Direction Finding (RDF) at Bawdsey Manor in Suffolk on the east coast of England had succeeded in building a system able to detect large aircraft at ranges over 40 miles (64 km). On 9 October, Watt wrote a memo calling for the construction of a chain of radar stations running down the east coast of England and Scotland, spaced about 20 miles (32 km) apart, providing early warning for the entire British Isles. This became known as Chain Home (CH), and soon the radars themselves became known by the same name. Development continued, and by the end of 1935 the range had improved to over 80 miles (130 km), reducing the number of stations required.

During 1936 the experimental system at Bawdsey was tested against a variety of simulated attacks, along with extensive development of interception theory carried out at RAF Biggin Hill. One observer was Hugh Dowding, initially as the director of research for the RAF, and later as the commander of RAF Fighter Command. Dowding noted that the CH stations provided so much information that operators had problems relaying it to the pilots, and the pilots had problems understanding it. He addressed this through the creation of what is today known as the Dowding system.

The Dowding system relied on a private telephone network forwarding information from the CH stations, Royal Observer Corps (ROC), and pip-squeak radio direction finding (RDF) to a central room where the reports were plotted on a large map. This information was then telephoned to the four regional Group headquarters, who re-created the map covering their area of operations. Details from these maps would then be sent to each Group's Sectors, covering one or two main airbases, and from there to the pilots via radio. This process took time, during which the target aircraft moved. As the CH systems were only accurate to about 1 km at best, subsequent reports were scattered and could not place a target more accurately than about 5 miles (8.0 km). This was fine for daytime interceptions; the pilots would have normally spotted their targets within this range.

=== Night bombing ===
Henry Tizard, whose Committee for the Scientific Survey of Air Defence spearheaded development of the CH system, grew concerned that CH would be too effective. He expected that the Luftwaffe would suffer so many losses that they would be forced to call off daylight attacks, and would turn to a night bombing effort. Their predecessors in World War I did the same when the London Air Defence Area successfully blocked daytime raids, and attempts to intercept German bombers at night proved comically ineffective. Tizard's concerns would prove prophetic; Bowen called it "one of the best examples of technological forecasting made in the twentieth century".

Tizard was aware that tests showed an observer would only be able to see an aircraft at night at a range of about 1,000 feet (300 m), perhaps 2,000 feet (610 m) under the very best moonlit conditions, an accuracy that the Dowding system could not provide. Adding to the problem would be the loss of information from the ROC, who would not be able to spot the aircraft except under the very best conditions. If the interception was to be handled by radar, it would have to be arranged in the short time between initial detection and the aircraft passing beyond the CH sites on the shoreline.

Tizard put his thoughts in a 27 April 1936 letter to Hugh Dowding, who was at that time the Air Member for Research and Development. He also sent a copy to Watt, who forwarded it to the researchers who were moving to their new research station at Bawdsey Manor. In a meeting at the Crown and Castle pub, Bowen pressed Watt for permission to form a group to study the possibility of placing a radar on the aircraft itself. (Note: Different accounts suggest that it was the Air Ministry or the Tizard Committee that pressed for development of AI. However, none of these directly state that they suggested airborne radar as the solution. Bowen's account does this, and his version is included here as it is the most detailed and is not directly contraindicated by any of the other references.) This would mean the CH stations would only need to get the fighter into the general area of the bomber, the fighter would be able to use its own radar for the rest of the interception. Watt was eventually convinced that the staffing needed to support development of both CH and a new system was available, and the Airborne Group was spun off from the CH effort in August 1936.

=== Early efforts ===
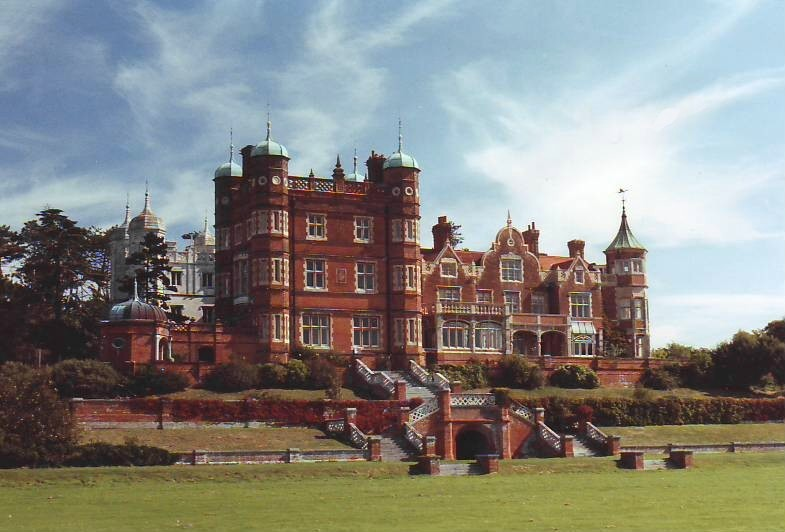
Bowen's first 6.7 m set broadcast from the Red Tower to the White Tower, both visible on the left side of this image of Bawdsey Manor.

Bowen started the aircraft interception (AI) radar efforts by discussing the issue with two engineers at nearby RAF Martlesham Heath, Fred Roland, and N.E. Rowe. He also made a number of visits to Fighter Command headquarters at RAF Bentley Priory and discussed night fighting techniques with anyone who proved interested. The first criteria for an airborne radar, operable by either the pilot or an observer, included:

- weight not to exceed 200 pounds (91 kg),
- installed space of 8 cubic feet (0.23 m^{3}) or less,
- maximum power use of 500 W (watts), and
- antennas of 1 foot (30 cm) length or less.

Bowen led a new team to build what was then known as RDF2, the original systems becoming RDF1. They began looking for a suitable receiver system, and immediately had a stroke of good luck; EMI had recently constructed a prototype receiver for the experimental BBC television broadcasts on 6.7 m wavelength (45 MHz). The receiver used seven or eight vacuum tubes (valves) (Note: Bowen uses the term "seven or eight". It appears that the original design had seven tubes, and the eighth was added during conversion to higher frequencies.) on a chassis only 3 inches (7.6 cm) in height and about 18 inches (46 cm) long. Combined with a CRT display, the entire system weighed only 20 pounds (9.1 kg). Bowen later described it as "far and away better than anything which [had] been achieved in Britain up to that time."

Only one receiver was available, which was moved between aircraft for testing. A transmitter of the required power was not available in portable form. Bowen decided to gain some familiarity with the equipment by building a ground-based transmitter. Placing the transmitter in Bawdsey's Red Tower and the receiver in the White Tower, they found they were able to detect aircraft as far as 40 to 50 miles (64–80 km) away.

=== RDF 1.5 ===
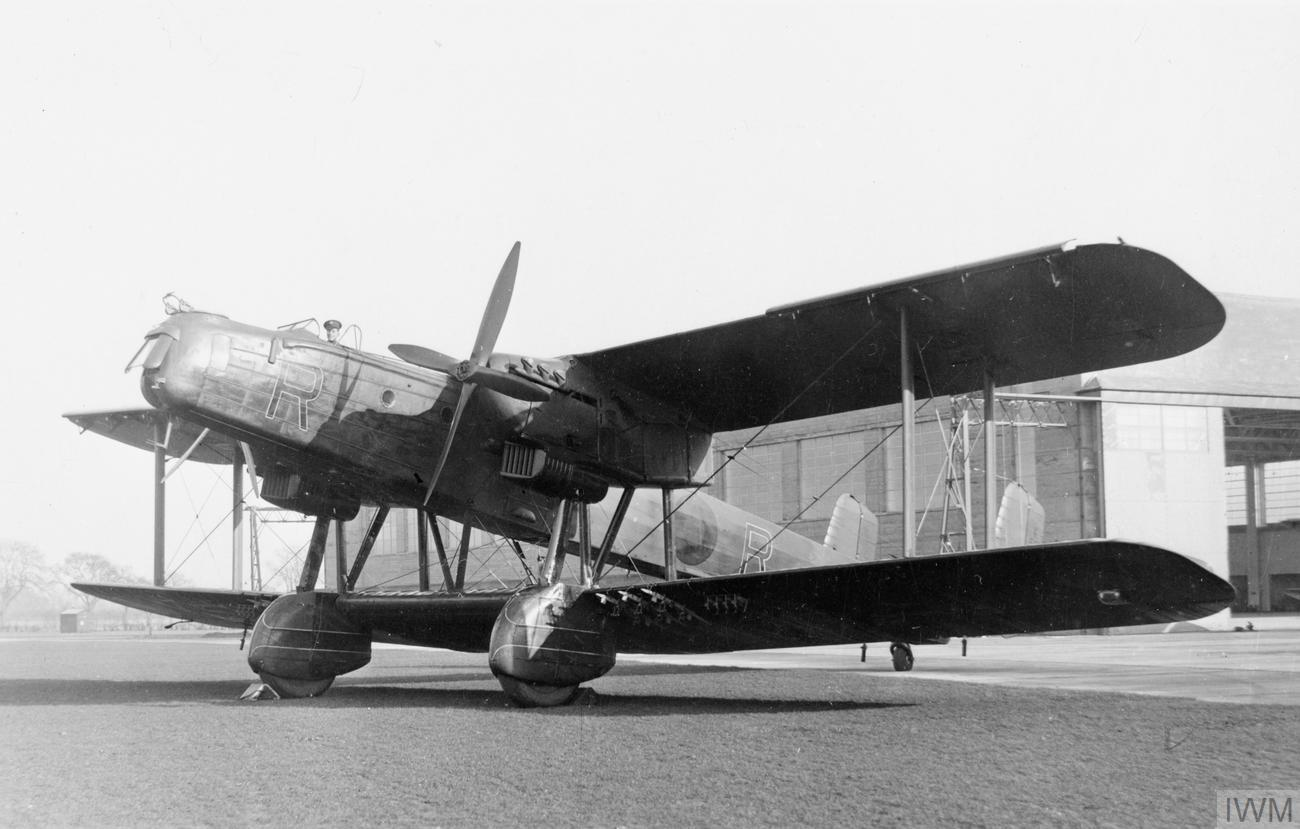
The ungainly Heyford holds title to two important firsts in radar history; it was the first aircraft to be detected by radar, and the first to carry a radar system.

With the basic concept proven, the team then looked for a suitable aircraft to carry the receiver. Martlesham provided a Handley Page Heyford bomber, a reversal of duties from the original Daventry Experiment that led to the development of CH in which a Heyford was the target. One reason for the selection of this design was that its Rolls-Royce Kestrel engines had a well-shielded ignition system which gave off minimal electrical noise.

Mounting the receiver in the Heyford was not a trivial task; the standard half-wave dipole antenna needed to be about 3.5 metres (11 ft) long to detect wavelengths of 6.7 m. The solution was eventually found by stringing a cable between the Heyford's fixed landing gear struts. A series of dry cell batteries lining the aircraft floor powered the receiver, providing high voltage for the CRT through an ignition coil taken from a Ford car.

When the system took to the air for the first time in the autumn of 1936, it immediately detected aircraft flying in the circuit at Martlesham, 8 to 10 miles (13–16 km) away, in spite of the crudity of the installation. Further tests were just as successful, with the range pushed out to 12 miles (19 km).

It was around this time that Watt arranged for a major test of the CH system at Bawdsey with many aircraft involved. Dowding had been promoted to Air Officer Commanding Fighter Command, and was on hand to watch. Things did not go well; for unknown reasons the radar did not pick up the approaching aircraft until they were far too close to arrange interception. Dowding was watching the screens intently for any sign of the bombers, failing to find one when he heard them pass overhead. Bowen averted total disaster by quickly arranging a demonstration of his system in the Red Tower, which picked out the aircraft as they re-formed 50 miles (80 km) away.

The system, then known as RDF 1.5, (Note: So-named because it was halfway between the ground-based RDF 1 of CH and a true airborne set that would be RDF 2. Note that in White's History, RDF 1.5 is referred to as RDF1R in some places and not others; this appears to be a printer's error. Hanbury-Brown refers to it as RDF1α.) would require a large number of ground-based transmitters to work in an operational setting. Moreover, good reception was only achieved when the target, interceptor, and transmitter were roughly in a line. Due to these limitations, the basic concept was considered unworkable as an operational system, and all effort moved to designs with both the transmitter and receiver in the interceptor aircraft.

Bowen would later lament this decision in his book Radar Days, where he noted his feelings about failing to follow up on the RDF 1.5 system:

With hindsight, it is now clear that this was a grave mistake. ... In the first place, it would have given them an interim device on which test interceptions could have been carried out at night, two whole years before the outbreak of war. This would have provided pilots and observers with training in the techniques of night interception, something they did not actually get until war was declared.

Another attempt to revive the RDF 1.5 concept, today known more generally as bistatic radar, was made in March 1940 when a modified set was mounted in Bristol Blenheim serial L6622. This set was tuned to the transmissions of the new Chain Home Low transmitters, dozens of which were being set up along the UK coastline. These experiments did not prove successful, with a detection range on the order of 4 miles (6.4 km), and the concept was abandoned for good.

=== Giant acorns, shorter wavelengths, and ASV ===
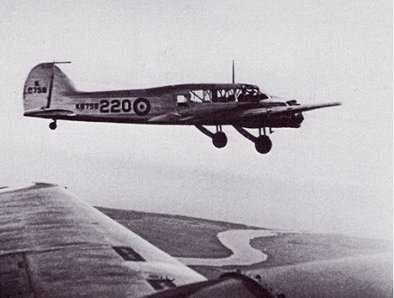
Avro Anson K8758, as seen from K6260. K6260 carried the radar unit while K8758 acted as a target.

The team received a number of Western Electric Type 316A large acorn vacuum tubes in early 1937. These were suitable for building transmitter units of about 20 W continual power for wavelengths of 1 to 10 m (300 to 30 MHz). Percy Hibberd built a prototype transmitter with pulses of a few hundred watts and fitted it to the Heyford in March 1937.

In testing the transmitter proved only barely suitable in the air-to-air role, with short detection ranges due to its relatively low power. But to everyone's surprise, it was able to easily pick out the wharves and cranes at the Harwich docks a few miles south of Bawdsey. Shipping appeared as well, but the team was unable to test this very well as the Heyford was forbidden to fly over water. After this success, Bowen was granted two Avro Anson patrol aircraft, K6260 and K8758, along with five pilots stationed at Martlesham to test this ship-detection role. Early tests demonstrated a problem with noise from the ignition system interfering with the receiver, but this was soon resolved by fitters at the Royal Aircraft Establishment (RAE).

Meanwhile, Hibberd had successfully built a new push–pull amplifier using two of the same tubes but working in the 1.25-meter band, an upper-VHF band (around 220 MHz); below 1.25 m the sensitivity dropped off sharply. Gerald Touch, originally from the Clarendon Laboratory, converted the EMI receiver to this wavelength by using the existing set as the intermediate frequency (IF) stage of a superheterodyne circuit. The original 45 MHz frequency would remain the IF setting for many following radar systems. On its first test on 17 August, Anson K6260 with Touch and Keith Wood aboard immediately detected shipping in the English Channel at a range of 2 to 3 miles (3.2–4.8 km). The team later increased the wavelength slightly to 1.5 m to improve sensitivity of the receiver, and this 200 MHz setting would be common to many radar systems of this era.

After hearing of the success, Watt called the team and asked if they would be available for testing in September, when a combined fleet of Royal Navy ships and RAF Coastal Command aircraft would be carrying out military exercises in the Channel. On the afternoon of 3 September the aircraft successfully detected the battleship HMS Rodney, the aircraft carrier HMS Courageous and the light cruiser HMS Southampton, receiving very strong returns. The next day they took off at dawn and, in almost complete overcast, found Courageous and Southampton at a distance of 5 to 6 miles (8.0–9.7 km). As they approached the ships and eventually became visible, they could see the Courageous launching aircraft in a futile effort to intercept them. The promise of the system was not lost on observers; Albert Percival Rowe of the Tizard Committee commented that "This, had they known, was the writing on the wall for the German Submarine Service."

Airborne radar for detecting ships at sea came to be known as air-to-surface-vessel (ASV) radar. Its successes led to continued demands for additional tests. Growing interest and increased efforts in ASV contributed to delays in airborne intercept sets; the team spent a considerable time in 1937 and 1938 working on the ASV problem.

=== ASV emerges ===
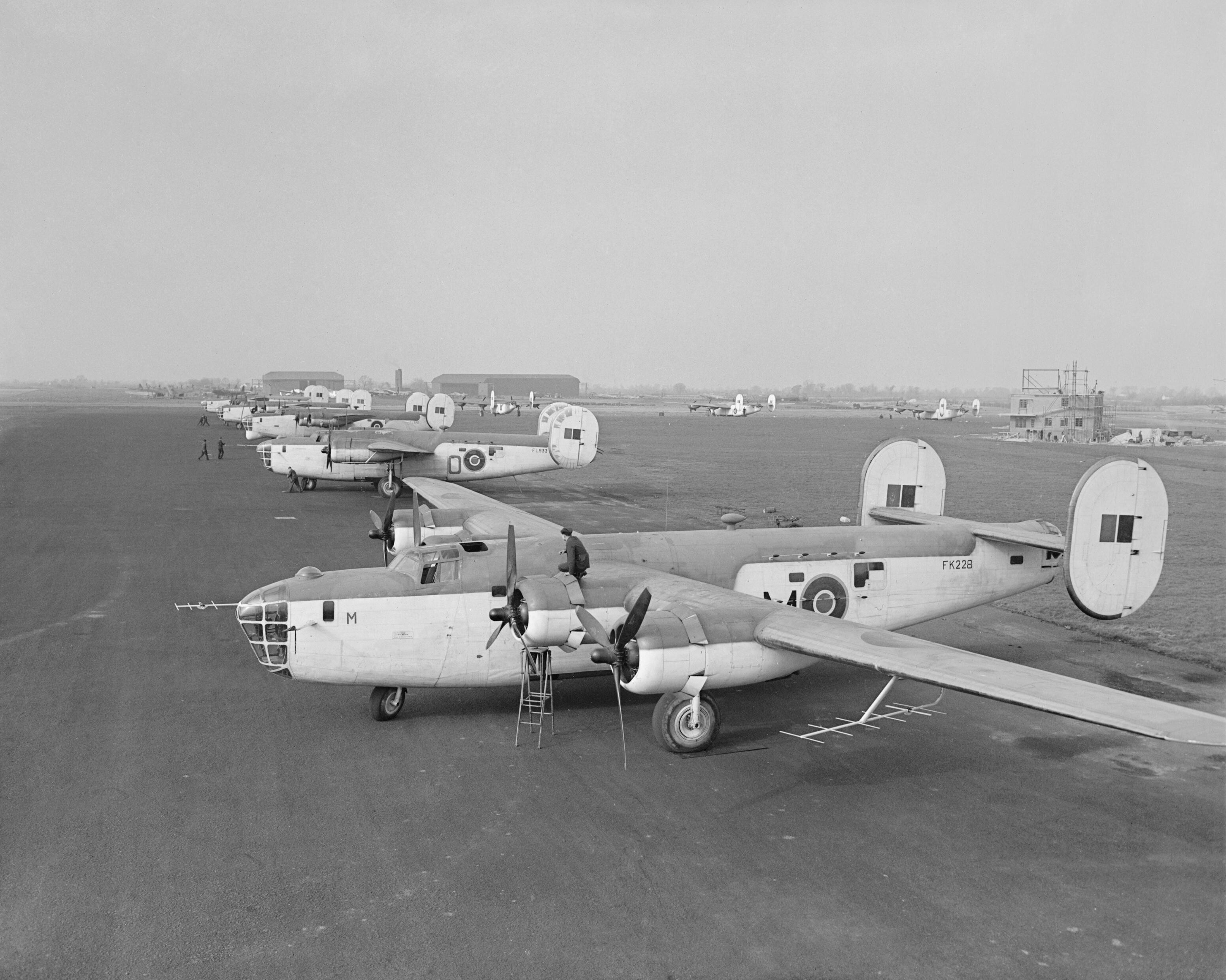
ASV was mounted on larger slow-flying aircraft like this ASV Mk. II-equipped Coastal Command Liberator GR Mk III. This made mounting large antennas easier than on night fighters.

In May 1938 A.P. Rowe took over Bawdsey Manor from Watt, who had been appointed Director of Communications Development at the Air Ministry. The remainder of 1938 was taken up with practical problems in the development of ASV. One change was the use of the new Western Electric 4304 tubes in place of the earlier 316As. These allowed a further increase in power to pulses around 2 kW, which provided detection of ships at 12 to 15 miles (19–24 km). Their test target was the Cork Lightship, a small boat anchored about 4 miles (6.4 km) from the White Tower. This performance against such a small vessel was enough to prompt the Army to begin work on what would become the Coast Defence (CD) radars. The Army cell had first been set up on 16 October 1936 to develop the Gun Laying radar systems.

Another change was due to every part of the equipment having different power requirements. The tubes for the transmitter used 6 V to heat their filaments, but 4 V was needed for the receiver tubes and 2 V for the filament of the CRT. The CRT also needed 800 V for its electron gun, but the transmitter tubes 1000 V for their modulators (drivers). At first, the team used motor-generator sets placed in the Anson and Battle fuselages, or batteries connected in various ways as in the earliest sets in the Heyfords. Bowen decided the solution was to build a power supply that would produce all of these DC voltages from a single 240 V 50 Hz supply using transformers and rectifiers. This would allow them to power the radar systems using mains power while the aircraft were on the ground.

British aero engines were normally equipped with a power take-off shaft that led to the rear of the engine. In twin engine aircraft like the Anson, one of these would be used for a generator that powered the aircraft instruments at 24 V DC, the other would be left unconnected and available for use. Following a suggestion from Watt to avoid Air Ministry channels, in October Bowen flew one of the Battles to the Metropolitan-Vickers (Metrovick) plant in Sheffield, where he pulled the DC generator off the engine, (Note: Literally; Bowen exited the aircraft, took a wrench, and unbolted the generator from the engine. This caused problems on their return flight.) dropped it on the table, and asked for an AC alternator of similar size and shape. Arnold Tustin, Metrovick's lead engineer, was called in to consider the problem, and after a few minutes he returned to say that he could supply an 80 V unit at 1200 to 2400 Hz and 800 W, even better than the 500 W requested. Bowen had an order for 18 pre-production units placed as soon as possible, and the first units started arriving at the end of October. A second order for 400 more quickly followed. Eventually about 133,800 of these alternators would be produced during the war.

=== Working design ===
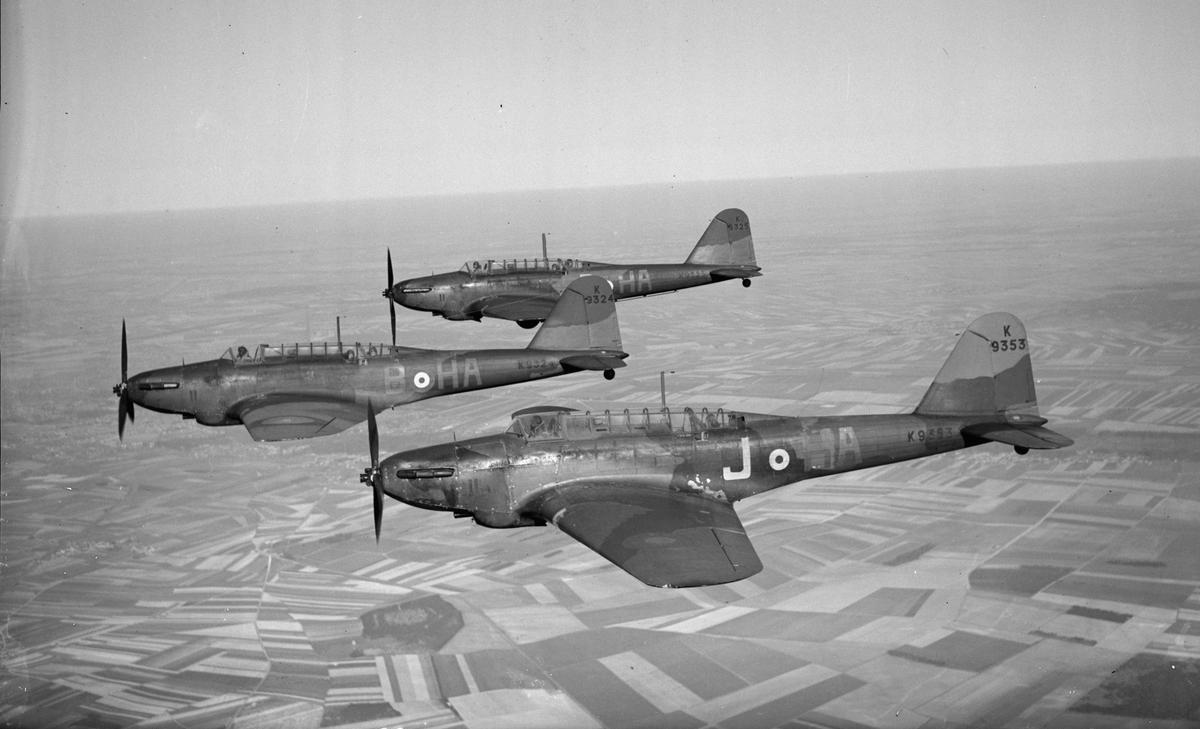
The Fairey Battle offered fighter-like performance while still offering room for both a radar operator and observer.

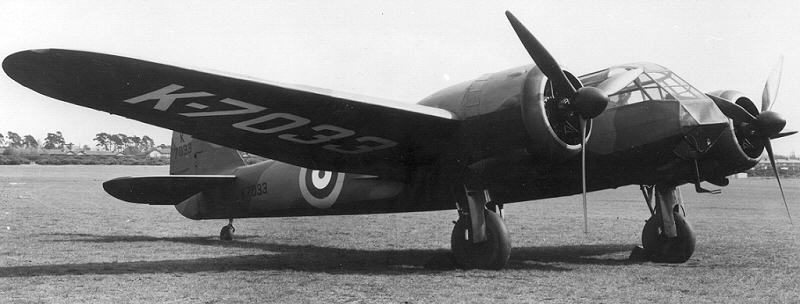
Further testing was carried out on this Bristol Blenheim, K7033, the original Blenheim prototype.

To better test the needs of AI, an aircraft with the speed needed to intercept a modern bomber was needed. In October 1938 the team was provided with two Fairey Battle light bombers, which had performance and size more suited to the night fighter role. Battles K9207 and K9208, and the crew to fly them, were sent to Martlesham; K9208 was selected to carry the radar, while K9207 was used as a target and support aircraft. (Note: Hanbury Brown also describes some flights being made in a Hawker Hart, an older biplane light bomber.)

By 1939, it was clear that war was looming, and the team began to turn their primary attention from ASV back to AI. A new set, built by combining the transmitter unit from the latest ASV units with the EMI receiver, first flew in a Battle in May 1939. The system demonstrated a maximum range that was barely adequate, around 2 to 3 miles (3.2–4.8 km), but the too-long minimum range proved to be a far greater problem.

The minimum range of any radar system is due to its pulse width, the length of time that the transmitter is turned on before it turns off so the receiver can listen for reflections from targets. If the echo from the target is received while the transmitter is still sending, the echo will be swamped by the transmitted pulse backscattering off local sources. For instance, a radar with a pulse width of 1 μs would not be able to see returns from a target less than 150 m away, because the radar signal travelling at the speed of light would cover the round trip distance of 300 m before that 1 μs interval had passed.

In the case of ASV this was not a problem; aircraft would not approach a ship on the surface more closely than its altitude of perhaps a few thousand feet, so a longer pulse width was fine. But in the AI role, the minimum range was pre-defined by the pilot's eyesight, at 300 m or less for night interception, which demanded sub-microsecond pulse widths. This proved very difficult to arrange, and ranges under 1,000 feet were difficult to produce.

Gerald Touch invested considerable effort in solving this problem and eventually concluded that a sub-1 μs transmitter pulse was possible. However, when this was attempted it was found that signals would leak through to the receiver and cause it to be blinded for a period, longer than 1 μs. He developed a solution using a time base generator that both triggered the transmitter pulse as well as cut out the front-end of the receiver, causing it to become far less sensitive during this period. This concept became known as squegging. In extensive tests in Anson K6260, Touch finally settled on a minimum range of 800 feet (240 m) as the best compromise between visibility and sensitivity.

Additionally, the sets demonstrated a serious problem with ground reflections. The broadcast antenna sent out the pulse over a very wide area covering the entire forward side of the aircraft. This meant that some of the broadcast energy struck the ground and reflected back to the receiver. The result was a solid line across the display at a distance equal to the aircraft's altitude, beyond which nothing could be seen. This was fine when the aircraft was flying at 15,000 feet (4.6 km) or more and the ground return was at about the maximum useful range, but meant that interceptions carried out at lower altitudes offered increasingly shorter range.

=== Dowding visits ===
In May 1939 the unit was transferred to a Battle, and in mid-June "Stuffy" Dowding was taken on a test flight. Bowen operated the radar and made several approaches from various points. Dowding was impressed, and asked for a demonstration of the minimum range. He instructed Bowen to have the pilot hold position once they had made their closest approach on the radar scope so they could look up and see how close that really was. Bowen relates the outcome:

For the previous 30 or 40 minutes our heads had been under the black cloth shielding the cathode-ray tubes. I whipped the cloth off and Stuffy looked straight ahead and said "Where is it? I can't see it." I pointed straight up; we were flying almost directly underneath the target. "My God" said Stuffy "tell him to move away, we are too close".

Dowding's version of the same events differs. He states he was "tremendously impressed" by the potential, but pointed out to Bowen that the 1,000 foot minimum range was a serious handicap. He makes no mention of the close approach, and his wording suggests that it did not take place. Dowding reports that when they met again later in the day, Bowen stated that he had made a sensational advance, and the minimum range had been reduced to only 220 feet (67 m). Dowding reports this uncritically, but the historical record demonstrates no such advance had been made.

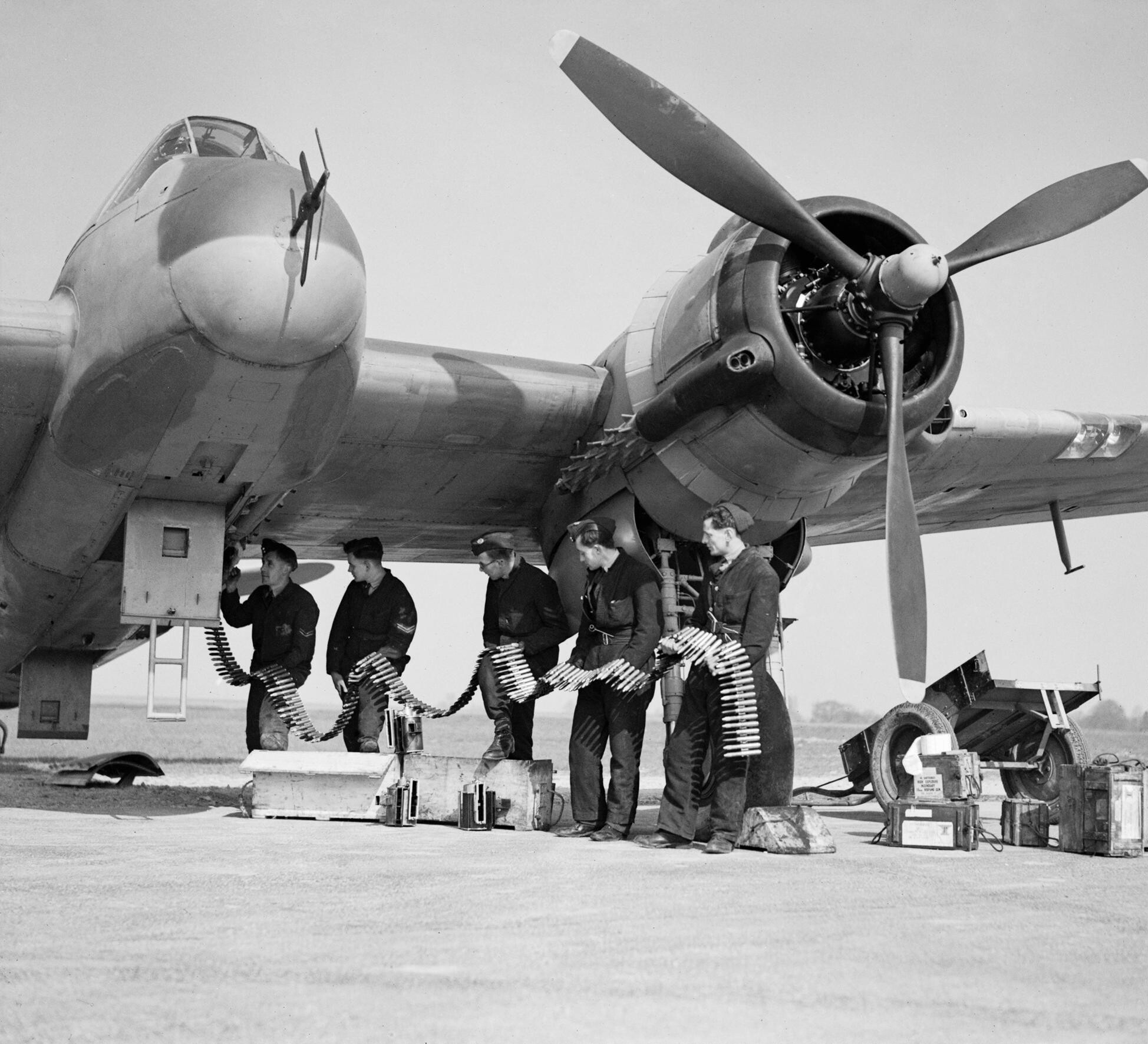
The Beaufighter solved Dowding's concerns about armament, carrying both machine guns and a quartet of 20 mm cannon.

On their return to Martlesham, Dowding outlined his concerns about night interceptions and the characteristics of a proper night fighter. Since the interceptions were long affairs, the aircraft needed to have long endurance. To ensure that friendly fire was not an issue, pilots would be required to identify all targets visually. This meant a separate radar operator would be needed, so the pilot would not lose his night vision by looking at the CRTs. And finally, since the time needed to arrange an interception was so long, the aircraft required armament that could guarantee destruction of a bomber in a single pass—there was little chance a second interception could be arranged.

Dowding later wrote a memo considering several aircraft for the role, rejecting the Boulton Paul Defiant two-seat turret fighter due to its cramped rear turret area. He was sure the Bristol Beaufighter would be perfect for the role, but it would not be ready for some time. So he selected the Bristol Blenheim light bomber for the immediate term, sending two of the early prototypes to Martlesham Heath to be fitted with the radar from the Battles. Blenheim K7033 was fitted with the radar, while K7034 acted as the target. Both of these aircraft lost a propeller in flight but landed safely; K7033s propeller was never found, but K7034's was returned to Martlesham the next day by an irate farmer.

=== Mk. I ===
Even at the 1.5 m wavelength, antennas of practical size had relatively low gain and very poor resolution; the transmitter antenna created a fan-shaped signal over 90 degrees wide. This was not useful for homing on a target, so some system of direction indication was required. The team seriously considered phase comparison as a solution, but could not find a suitable phase shifting circuit.

Instead, a system of multiple receiver antennas was adopted, each one located so that only a certain section of the sky was visible. Two horizontal receivers were mounted on either side of the fuselage and only saw reflections from the left or right, slightly overlapping in the middle. Two vertical receivers were mounted above and below the wing, seeing reflections above or below the aircraft.

Each pair of antennas was connected to a motorized switch that rapidly switched between the pairs, a technique known as lobe switching. Both signals were then sent to a CRT for display, with one of them passing through a voltage inverter. If the target was to the left, the display would show a longer blip on the left than the right. When the target was dead ahead, the blips would be equal length. There was an inherently limited accuracy to such a solution, about five degrees but it was a practical solution in terms of limiting the antenna sizes.

By this point the Air Ministry was desperate to get any unit into service. Satisfied with his visit in May, Dowding suggested that the Mk. I was good enough for operational testing purposes. On 11 June 1939, AI was given the highest priority and provisions were made to supply 11 additional Blenheims to No 25 squadron at RAF Hawkinge (for a total of 21). Since each of the parts came from different suppliers, and the fitters were unfamiliar with any of it, members of the AI team would have to hand-assemble the components as they arrived and instruct the fitters on the sets.

Watt was waiting for the order, and in 1938 had arranged for production of the transmitters at Metrovick and receivers at A.C. Cossor. These turned out to be the wrong products: Metrovick had been told to directly copy ("Chinese") the 1937 design by Percy Hibberd, but Bawdsey had delivered the wrong prototype to Metrovick, who copied it. The Cossor receivers were found to be unusable, weighing as much as the entire transmitter and receiver, and having sensitivity about half that of the EMI lash-up.

=== Pye strip ===
It was at this point that the team had yet another stroke of luck. Bowen's former thesis advisor at King's College, London, was Edward Appleton, who had worked with Watt and Harold Pye during the 1920s. Pye had since gone on to form his own radio company, Pye Ltd., and was active in the television field. They had recently introduced a new television set based on an innovative vacuum tube developed by Philips of Holland, the EF50 pentode. Appleton mentioned the Pye design to Bowen, who found it to be a great improvement over the EMI version, and was happy to learn there had been a small production run that could be used for their experiments. The design became widely known as the Pye strip.

The Pye strip was such an advance on the EMI unit that the EF50 became a key strategic component. As a German invasion of the west loomed in 1940, the British contacted Philips and arranged a plan to remove the company's board of directors to the UK, along with 25,000 more EF50s and another 250,000 bases, onto which Mullard, Philips's UK subsidiary, could build complete tubes. A destroyer, HMS Windsor, was dispatched to pick them up in May, and left the Netherlands only days before the German invasion of the country on 15 May 1940. (Note: Ronald Dekker's very detailed history of the EF50 tube states that the tubes were not on the destroyers, as Bowen states, but on one of two commercial liners Koningin Emma or Princes Beatrix, which left for England on 10 May 1940. A destroyer was involved indirectly; HMS Windsor was used to evacuate Anton Philips and most of Philips's board of directors, along with a box containing industrial diamonds for wire-drawing machines at Mullard to make new bases for the tubes.) The Pye strip, and its 45 MHz intermediate frequency, would be re-used in many other wartime radar systems.

New Blenheims eventually arrived at Martlesham, these having been experimentally converted to heavy fighters with the addition of four .303 British (7.7 mm) Browning machine guns and four 20mm Hispano autocannon, while removing the mid-upper turret to reduce weight by 800 lb (360 kg) and drag by a small amount. (Note: Not all F-series aircraft had their turrets removed; several war-time images show Blenheim night fighters with their mid-upper turrets. A typical example can be found in image CH 1585 at the IWM, and White has a similar image of Blenheim K7159 (YX+N), one of the Mk. I test aircraft, with turret. An illustration of this aircraft appears here.) These arrived without any of the racking or other fittings required to mount the radar, which had to be constructed by local fitters. Further deliveries were not the Blenheim Mk. IF (Note: Modern sources generally refer to these with a capital F but the lower-case version appears in most of the references used in this article, notably those written by the engineers.) and IIF models originally provided, but the new Mk. IVF versions with a longer and redesigned nose. The gear had to be re-fitted for the new aircraft, and the receivers and CRTs were mounted in the enlarged nose, allowing the operator to indicate corrections to the pilot through hand signals as a backup if the intercom failed.

By September, several Blenheims were equipped with what was now officially known as AI Mk. I and training of the crews began with No. 25 Squadron at RAF Northolt. Robert Hanbury Brown, a physicist who would later work on radar in the US, and Keith Wood joined them in August 1939, helping fitters keep the systems operational, and coming up with useful methods for interception. Near the end of August, Dowding visited the base and saw the radars in the nose and pointed out to Bowen that the enemy gunners would see the light from the CRTs and shoot the operator. The sets were re-fitted once again, returning to the rear of the fuselage, which caused more delays.

With the units in the rear, the only communications method was via the intercom. Contemporary systems used the radio as the intercom as well, but the TR9D sets used in RAF aircraft used the voice channel for 15 seconds every minute for the pip-squeak system, blocking communications. Even when modified sets were supplied that addressed this, the radar was found to interfere strongly with the intercom. A speaking tube was tried but found to be useless. Newer VHF radios being developed through this same period did not suffer these problems, and the Blenheims were moved to the front of the queue to receive these units.

=== Emergency move ===
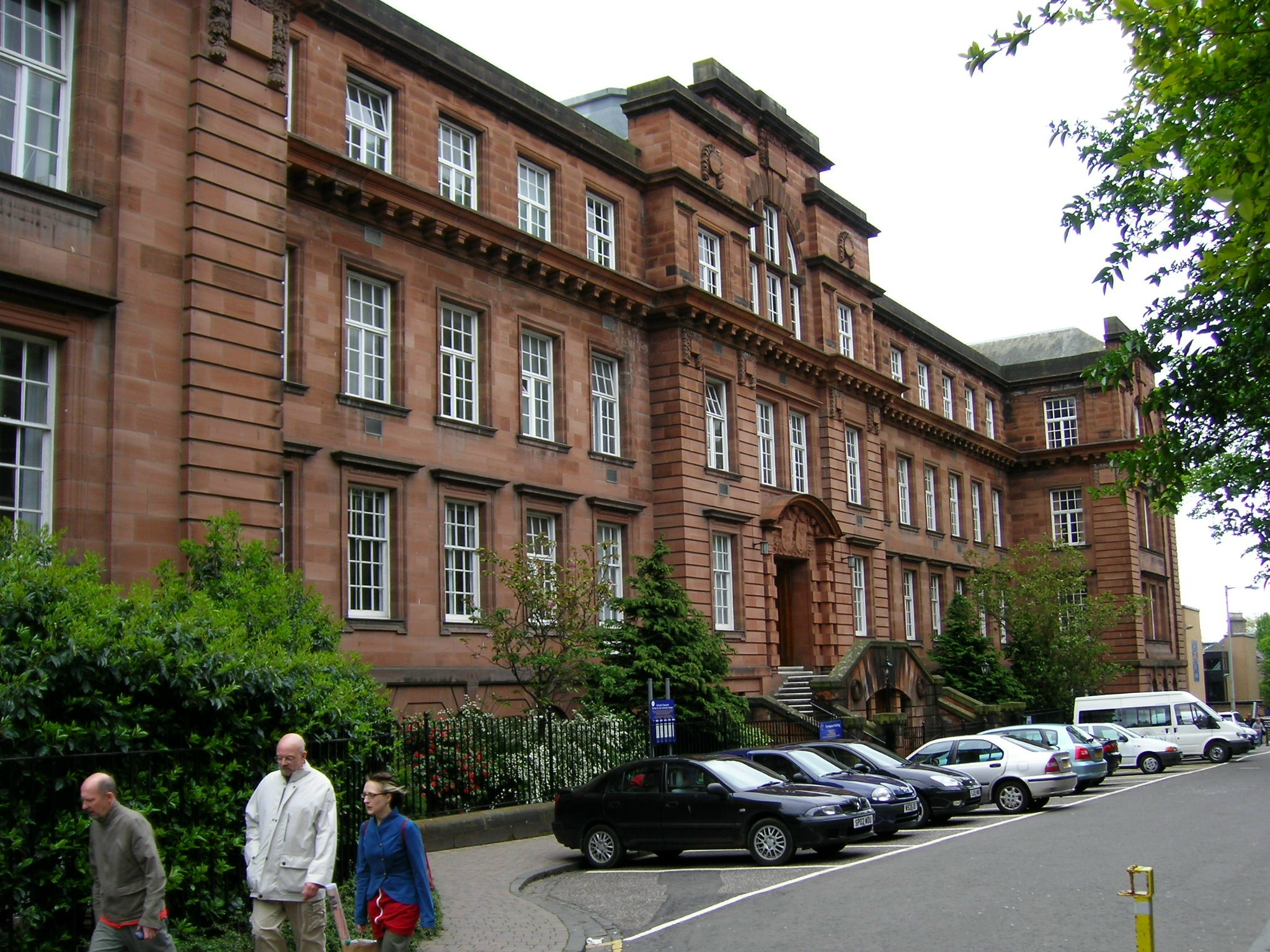
When the radar teams arrived in 1939, Dundee University, not much larger than Bawdsey, was filled with students.

Bawdsey, right on the eastern coast in a relatively secluded location, could not effectively be protected from air attack or even bombardment from boats offshore. The need to move the team to a more protected location on the opening of hostilities had been identified long before the war. During a visit to his alma mater at Dundee University, Watt approached the rector to ask about potentially basing the team there, on short notice. When the Germans invaded Poland and war was declared on 3 September 1939, the research teams packed up and arrived in Dundee to find the rector only dimly recalling the conversation and having nothing prepared for their arrival. Students and professors had since returned after the summer break, and only two small rooms were available for the entire group.

The AI group and their experimental aircraft of D Flight, Aeroplane and Armament Experimental Establishment (A&AEE), moved to an airport some distance away at Perth, Scotland. (Note: Although it is not noted specifically, this is likely Perth Airport, which had recently opened in 1936. This is suggested by Lovell's description of the site being in Scone, which is the town nearest the airport. No other airport is nearby.) The airport was completely unsuitable for the fitting work, with only a single small hangar available for aircraft work while a second was used for offices and labs. This required most of the aircraft to remain outside while others were worked on inside. Nevertheless, the initial group of aircraft was completed by October 1939. With this success, more and more aircraft arrived at the airport to have the AI team fit radars, most of these being the ASV units for patrol aircraft like the Lockheed Hudson and Short Sunderland patrol aircraft, followed by experimental fittings to Fleet Air Arm Fairey Swordfish torpedo bombers and Supermarine Walrus.

Bernard Lovell joined the radar team at the personal suggestion of Patrick Blackett, an original member of the Tizard Committee. He arrived at Dundee and met Sidney Jefferson, who told him he had been transferred to the AI group. The conditions at Perth were so crude that it was clearly affecting work, and Lovell decided to write to Blackett about it on 14 October. Among many concerns, he noted that;

The situation here is really unbelievable. Here they are shouting for hundreds of aircraft to be fitted. The fitters are working 7 days per week, and occasionally 15 hour days. In their own words, "the apparatus is tripe even for a television receiver".

Blackett removed any direct reference to Lovell and passed it to Tizard, who discussed the issue with Rowe during his next visit to Dundee. Rowe immediately surmised who had written the letter and called Lovell in to discuss it. Lovell thought little of it at the time, but later learned that Rowe had written back to Tizard on 26 October:

He clearly has no idea that I am aware he has written to Blackett. Judging purely from the letter you quoted to me I expected to find Lovell was a nasty piece of work who should be removed from the work. I find, however, that this is not the case.

Rowe surmised from the conversation that the main problem was that Perth was simply not suitable for the work. He decided that most of the research establishment, now known as the Air Ministry Research Establishment (AMRE), would remain in Dundee while the AI team should be moved to a more suitable location. This time the chosen location was RAF St Athan in Wales, about 15 miles (24 km) from Cardiff. St Athan was a large base that also served as an RAF training ground, and should have been an ideal location.

When the AI team arrived on 5 November 1939, they found themselves being housed in a disused hangar with no office space. A small amount of relief was found by using abandoned Heyford wings as partitions, but this proved largely useless as the weather turned cold. As the main doors of the hangar were normally left open during the day, it was often too cold to hold a screwdriver. Bowen complained that the conditions "would have produced a riot in a prison farm".

Ironically, Bawdsey was ignored by the Germans for the entire war, while St Athan was attacked by a Junkers Ju 88 only weeks after the team arrived. The single bomb struck the runway directly, but failed to explode.

=== Mk. II ===
With October's deliveries, the Air Ministry began plans for a production AI Mk. II. This differed largely by the addition of a new timebase system, which it was hoped would reduce the minimum range to a very useful 400 feet (120 m). When the new units were installed, it was found the minimum range had increased to 1000 feet. This problem was traced to unexpectedly high capacitance in the tubes, and with further work they were only able to return to the Mk. I's 800 feet. Blenheims from a number of squadrons were fitted with the Mk. II, with three aircraft each being allotted to No. 23, 25, 29, 219, 600 and 604 Squadrons in May 1940.

Two experimental versions of the Mk. II were tested. The AIH unit used GEC VT90 Micropup valves in place of the Acorns for additional power, the H standing for high power of about 5 kW. A test unit fitted to a Blenheim IF proved promising in March and a second was delivered in early April but development was ended for unknown reasons. The AIL had a locking timebase, which improved maximum range, at the cost of a greatly increased minimum range of 3,000 to 3,500 feet (0.91–1.07 km) and work was abandoned. (Note: No description of what a locking timebase might be is found in any of the references; the possibility of lock-follow can be discounted, as this did not appear until a year later and was named AIF.)

While aircraft were being delivered, Bowen, Tizard and Watt pressed the Air Ministry to appoint someone to command the entire night fighting system, from ensuring aircraft delivery and radar production to the training of pilots and ground crew. This led to the formation of the Night Interception Committee (so-named in July 1940) under the direction of Richard Peirse. Peirse raised the Night Interception Unit at RAF Tangmere on 10 April 1940; it was later renamed the Fighter Interception Unit (FIU).

Bowen led a series of lectures at Bentley Priory, on the theory of radar guided night interception and concluded that the fighter would require a speed advantage of 20 to 25% over its target. The main Luftwaffe bombers—the Junkers Ju 88, Dornier Do 17Z, and Heinkel He 111—were capable of flying at about 250 miles per hour (400 km/h), at least with a medium load. This implied a fighter would need to fly at least 300 miles per hour (480 km/h) and the Blenheim, fully loaded, was capable of only 280 miles per hour (450 km/h). Bowen's concerns over the poor speed of the Blenheim were proved right in combat.

=== Mk. III ===
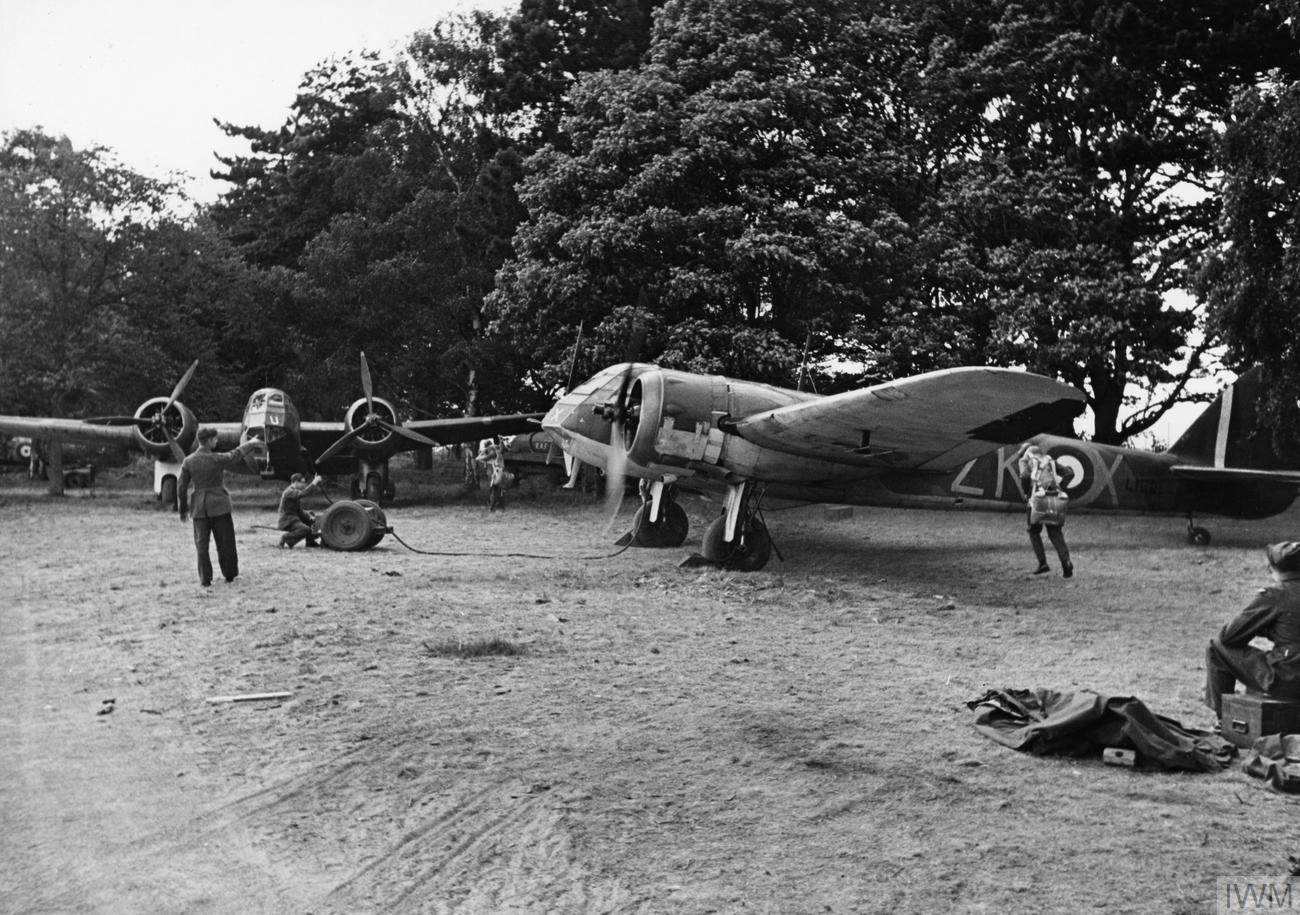
Two Blenheim Mk. IFs of No. 25 Sqn at Martlesham Heath run up on 25 July 1940. The aircraft on the right mounts the transmitter antenna in its original horizontal arrangement.

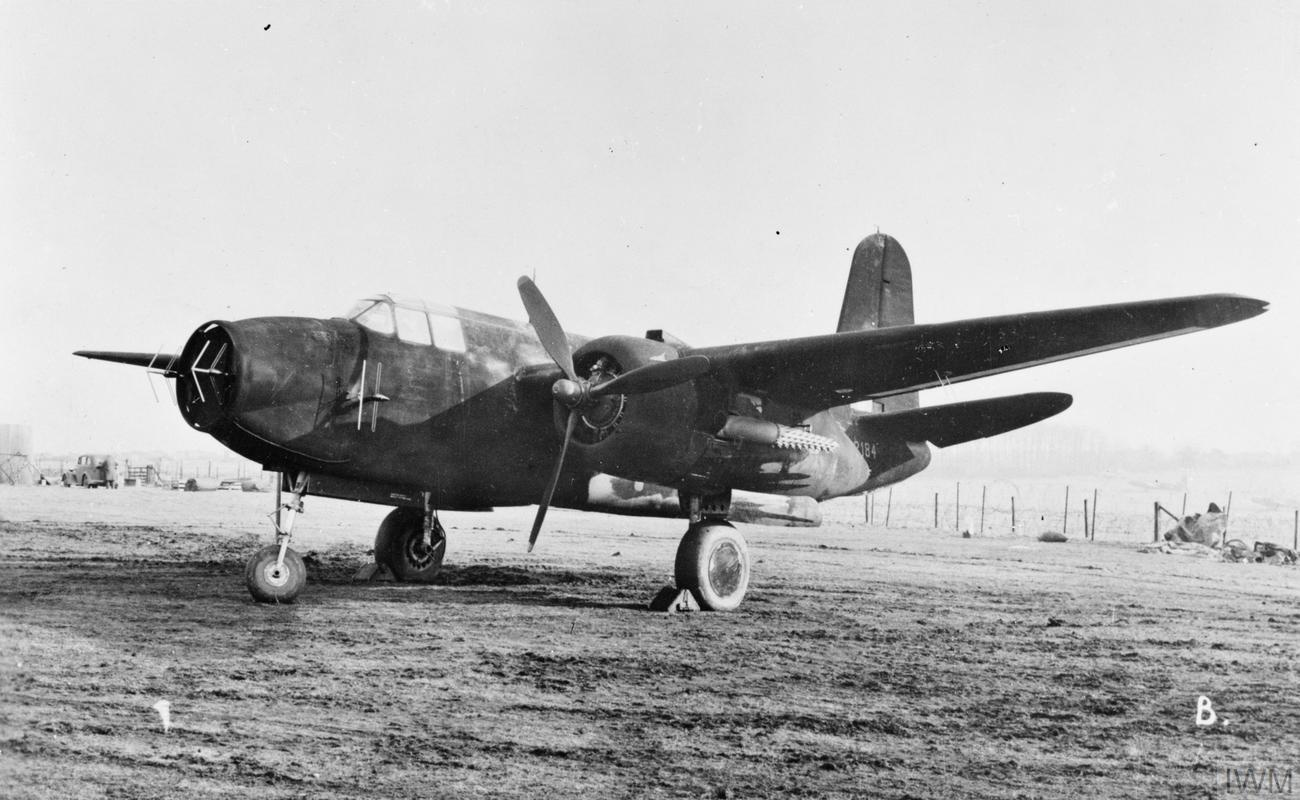
One effort to close the minimum range gap was to use a searchlight, as is the case on this Havoc mounting a Turbinlite in its nose. Note the Mk. IV antennas on either side. The Mk. IV guided the Havoc to close range and then the light was switched on, illuminating the target for other fighters to attack.

The Mk. II was used for only a short time when the team replaced its transmitter section with one from the ASV Mk. I, which used the new Micropup valves. (Note: The description of the Mk. III given by Hanbury Brown and White seems to be essentially identical to the AIH. What differences there were are not recorded in any of the available references.) The new AI Mk. III sets were experimentally fitted to about twenty Blenheim IFs in April 1940, where they demonstrated an improved maximum range of 3 to 4 miles (4.8–6.4 km). However, they still suffered from a long minimum range, from 800 to 1,500 ft depending on how the receiver was adjusted.

This led to what Hanbury Brown describes as "the great minimum range controversy". From October 1939, working around the clock to install the remaining Mk. I sets at Perth and St Athan, the team had had no time for further development of the electronics. They were aware that the minimum range was still greater than was satisfactory but Bowen and Hanbury Brown were convinced there was a simple solution they could implement once the initial installations were completed. Meanwhile, the current sets continued to be installed, although all were aware of their problems. On 24 January 1940 Arthur Tedder, the Director General for Research, admitted to Tizard that:

I am afraid much, if not most, of the trouble is due to our fatal mistake in rushing ahead into production and installation of AI before it was ready for production, installation, or for use. This unfortunate precipitance necessarily wrecked research work on AI since it involved diverting the research team from research proper to installation.

The issue of minimum range continued to be raised, working its way through the Air Ministry and eventually to Harold Lardner, head of what was then known as the Stanmore Research Centre. Rowe and his deputy Bennett Lewis were called to meet with Lardner to discuss the issue. Apparently without informing Lardner of Bowen and Hanbury Brown's potential solution, or the fact that they could not work on it due to the ongoing installations, they agreed to have Lewis investigate the matter. Lewis then sent a contract to EMI to see what they could do. According to both Bowen and Hanbury Brown, Rowe and Lewis instigated these events deliberately to pull control of the AI project from the AI team.

At Dundee, Lewis raised the issue and two solutions to improving the range were considered. The Mk. IIIA consisted of a set of minor changes to the transmitter and receiver with the goal of reducing the minimum range to about 800 feet (240 m). Lewis' own solution was the Mk. IIIB, which used a second transmitter that broadcast a signal that mixed with the main one to cancel it out during the end of the pulse. He believed this would reduce the minimum range to only 600 feet (180 m). Two copies of the IIIA entered tests in May 1940 and demonstrated little improvement, with the range reduced to only 950 feet (290 m), but at the cost of significantly reduced maximum range of only 8,500 feet (2.6 km). Tests of the IIIB waited while the AI team moved from St Athan to Worth Matravers in May, and were eventually overtaken by events. Development of both models was cancelled in June 1940.

Word that Lewis was developing his own solutions to the minimum range problem reached the AI team at St Athan some time in early 1940. Bowen was extremely upset. He had become used to the way the researchers had been put into an ill-advised attempt at production but now Rowe was directly removing them from the research effort as well. Tizard heard of the complaints and visited Dundee in an attempt to smooth them over, which evidently failed. On 29 March 1940 a memo from Watt's DCD office announced a reorganization of the Airborne Group. Gerald Touch would move to the RAE to help develop production, installation and maintenance procedures for the Mk. IV, several other members would disperse to RAF airfields to help train the ground and air crews directly on the units, while the rest of the team, including Lovell and Hodgkin, would re-join the main radar research teams in Dundee. Bowen was notably left out of the reorganization; his involvement in AI ended. In late July, Bowen was invited to join the Tizard Mission, which left for the US in August 1940.

=== Prototype use ===
Mk. III went into extensive testing at No. 25 Sqn in May 1940 and another troubling problem was found. As the target aircraft moved to the sides of the fighter, the error in the horizontal angle grew. Eventually, at about 60 degrees to the side, the target was indicated as being on the other side of the fighter. Hanbury Brown concluded that the problem was due to reflections between the fuselage and engine nacelles, due to the change to the long-nose IVF from the short-nose IF and IIF. In previous examples they had used the fuselage of the aircraft as the reflector, positioning and angling the antennas to run along the nose or wing leading edges.

He tried moving the horizontal antennas to the outside of the nacelles, but this had little effect. Another attempt using vertically oriented antennas "completely cured the problem", and allowed the antennas to be positioned anywhere along the wing. When he later tried to understand why the antennas had always been horizontal, he found this had come from the ASV trials where it was found this reduced reflections from the waves. Given the parallel development of the ASV and AI systems, this arrangement had been copied to the AI side without anyone considering other solutions.

At a meeting of the Night Interception Committee on 2 May it was decided that the bomber threat was greater than submarines, and the decision was made to move 80 of the 140 ASV Mk. I transmitters to AI, adding to 70 being constructed by EKCO (E.K. Cole). These would be turned into 60 IIIA's and 40 IIIB's. (Note: White mentions a total of 150 sets from ASV and EKCO, but then accounts for only 100 of these as different models.) At a further meeting on 23 May, Tizard, perhaps prompted by comments from Director of Signals (Air), suggested that the units were not suitable for operational use, especially due to low reliability, and should be confined to daylight training missions.

By 26 July 70 Blenheims were equipped with Mk. III and the RAE wrote an extensive report on the system. They too had concerns about what they called "partially reliable" systems and pointed out that a significant problem was due to the unreliable antenna connections and cabling. But they went further and stated that the self-exciting concept would simply not work for a production system. These systems used transmitter circuitry as an oscillator to produce the operating frequency, but they had the disadvantage of taking some time to stabilize and then shut down again. Hanbury Brown agreed with this assessment, as did Edmund Cook-Yarborough who had led work on the IIIB at Dundee.

=== Mk. IV ===
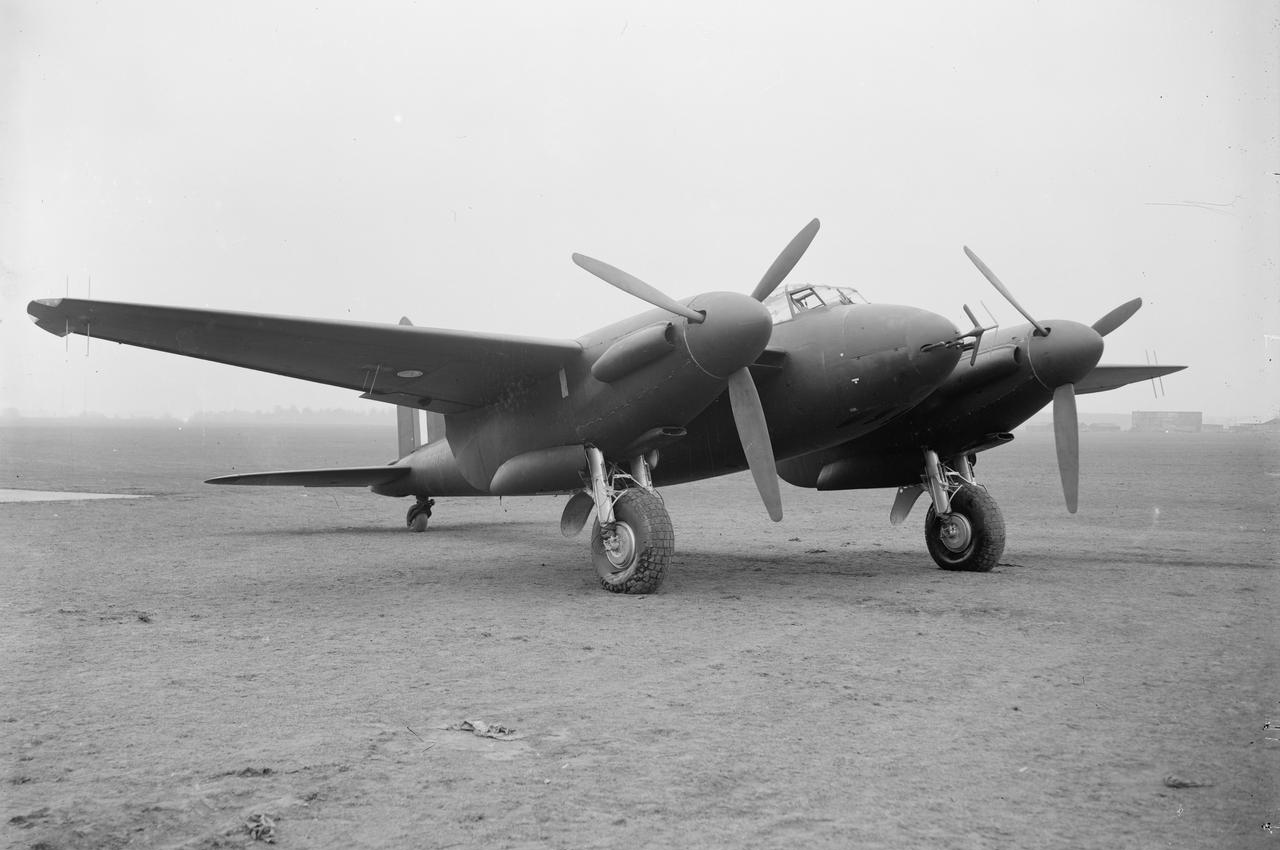
Early Mosquito night fighters were fitted with Mk. IV, like this NF Mark II, DD609.

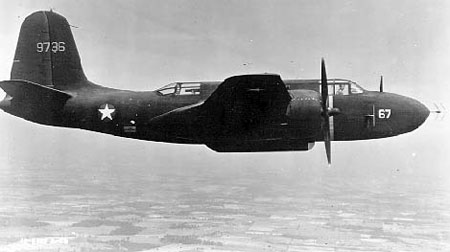
The Douglas P-70 equipped with the SCR-540 was the USAAF equivalent of the RAF's Havoc I with Mk. IV.

The RAE's comments about the self-exciting transmitter were not random: they were referring to work that was just coming to fruition at EMI as a direct result of Lewis' earlier contract. EMI engineers Alan Blumlein and Eric White had developed a system that dispensed with a self-exciting transmitter circuit and instead used a separate modulator that fed the signal into the transmitter for amplification. The oscillator signal was also sent to the receiver, using it to damp its sensitivity. The combined effect was to sharpen the transmitted pulse, while reducing 'ringing' in the receiver. In a test in May 1940, Hanbury Brown was able to clearly see the return at a range of 500 feet (150 m), and could still make it out when they approached to 400.

Touch, now at RAE Farnborough and having delivered improved versions of ASV, quickly adapted the new oscillator to the existing Mk. III transmitter. Adapting the vertical transmitting "arrowhead", folded twin-dipole antenna design on the nose of the aircraft, from Hanbury Brown's work with the Mk. III eliminated any remaining problems. In its first operational tests in July 1940, the new AI Mk. IV demonstrated the ability to detect another Blenheim at a range of 20,000 feet (6.1 km) and continued to track it down to a minimum of 500. Hanbury Brown stated that "it did everything that we had originally hoped that airborne radar would do for night-fighting". He went on to note that even though Mk. IV arrived only one year after the first Mk. I's, it felt like they had been working for ten years.

A production contract for 3,000 units was immediately started at EMI, Pye, and EKCO. When they left for the US in August, the Tizard Mission team took a Mk. IV, ASV Mk. II and IFF Mk. II with them, via the National Research Council (Canada). During the following discussions, it was agreed that the US would produce AI, while Canada would produce ASV. Western Electric arranged a production license for the Mk. IV in the US, where it was known as the SCR-540. Deliveries began for the P-70 (A-20 Havoc) and PV-1 aircraft in 1942.

== Operational use ==
=== Early operations ===
Throughout the development of the Mk. I to III, various units had been flying the systems in an effort to develop suitable interception techniques. Very early on it was decided to dispense with the full reporting chain of the Dowding system and have the radar operators at the Chain Home (CH) sites talk to the fighters directly, greatly reducing delays. This improved matters, and on an increasing number of occasions aircraft received direction from the CH stations towards real targets.

The crews were bound to get lucky eventually, and this came to pass on the night of 22/23 July 1940, when a Blenheim IF of the FIU received direction from the Poling CH station and picked up the target at 8,000 feet (1.5 mi; 2.4 km) range. The CH radar operator directed them until the observer visually spotted a Do 17. The pilot closed to 400 feet (120 m) before opening fire, continuing to close until they were so close that oil spewing from the target covered their windscreen. Breaking off, the Blenheim flipped upside down, and with no visibility the pilot didn't recover until reaching 700 feet (210 m). The target crashed off Bognor Regis, on the south coast of England. This was the first confirmed successful use of airborne radar known to history. (Note: White notes that modern sources claim that the German crew was rescued and the aircraft was identified as being part of 2 Staffel, Kampfgeschwader 3. He questions the validity of this claim.)

In spite of this success, it was clear the Blenheim was simply not going to work as a fighter. On several occasions the CH stations directed the fighters to a successful radar capture, only to have the target slowly pull away from the fighter. In one case the Blenheim was able to see the target, but when it spotted them the aircraft increased power and disappeared. From 1 to 15 October 1940 Mk. III-equipped fighters from RAF Kenley made 92 flights, performed 28 radar interceptions, and made zero kills.

The arrival of the Mk. IV in July 1940 improved matters, but it was the delivery of the Bristol Beaufighter starting in August that produced a truly effective system. The Beaufighter had considerably more powerful engines, speed that allowed it to catch its targets, and a powerful gun pack of four 20 mm cannon that could easily destroy a bomber in a single pass. Squadron use began in October, and its first victory came soon after on 19/20 November when a Beaufighter IF of No. 604 Squadron destroyed a Ju 88A-5 near Chichester, very close to the first success of the Mk. III. (Note: The crew of the Beaufighter did not claim a kill, as the Ju 88 disappeared from view and was not seen crashing. The kill was later confirmed when the Ju 88 crew was picked up, having parachuted from their aircraft.)

=== Dowding and AI ===
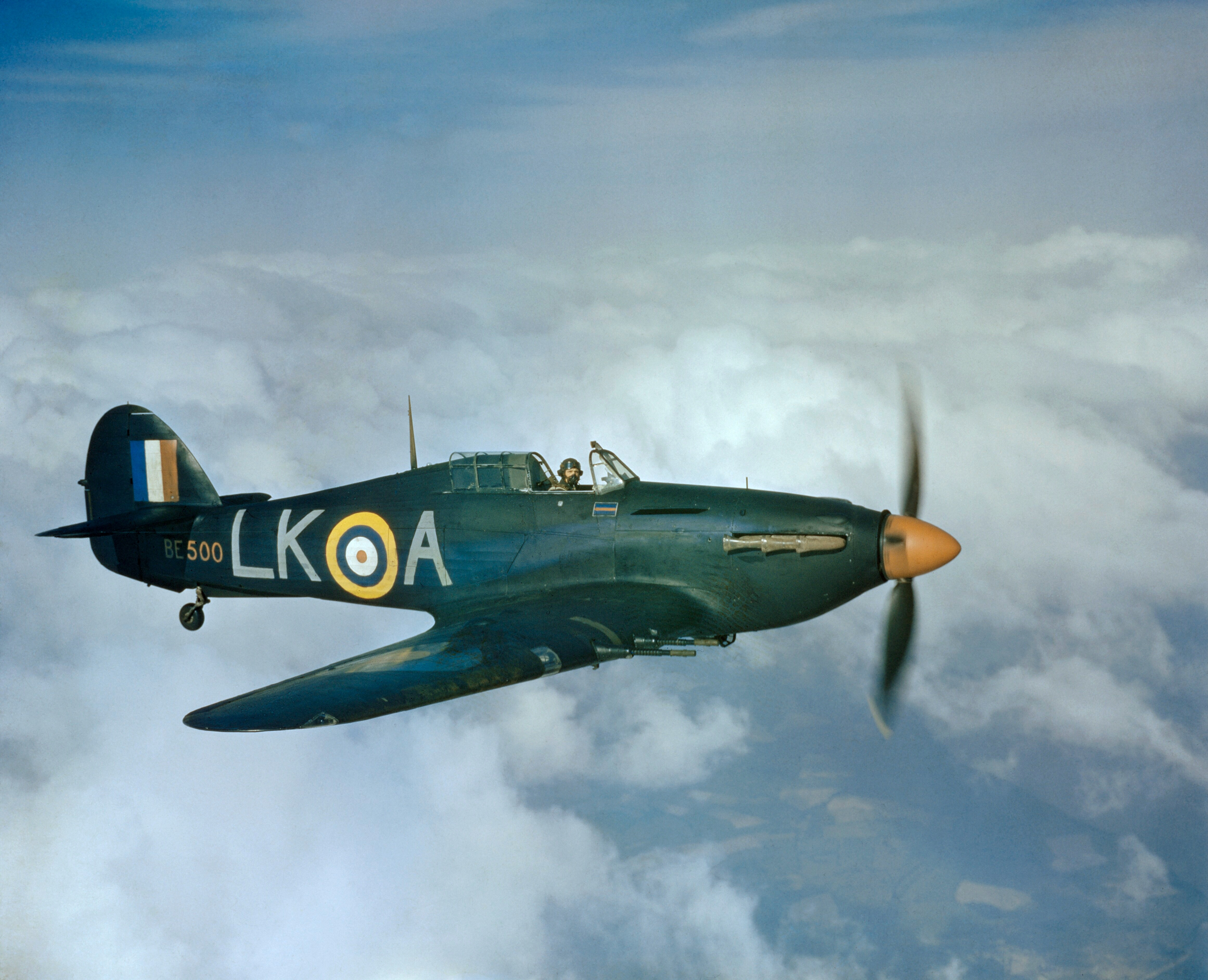
Hurricanes, like this Mk. IIC of 87 Sqn, were widely used as night fighters until 1942. Their success in this role was limited.

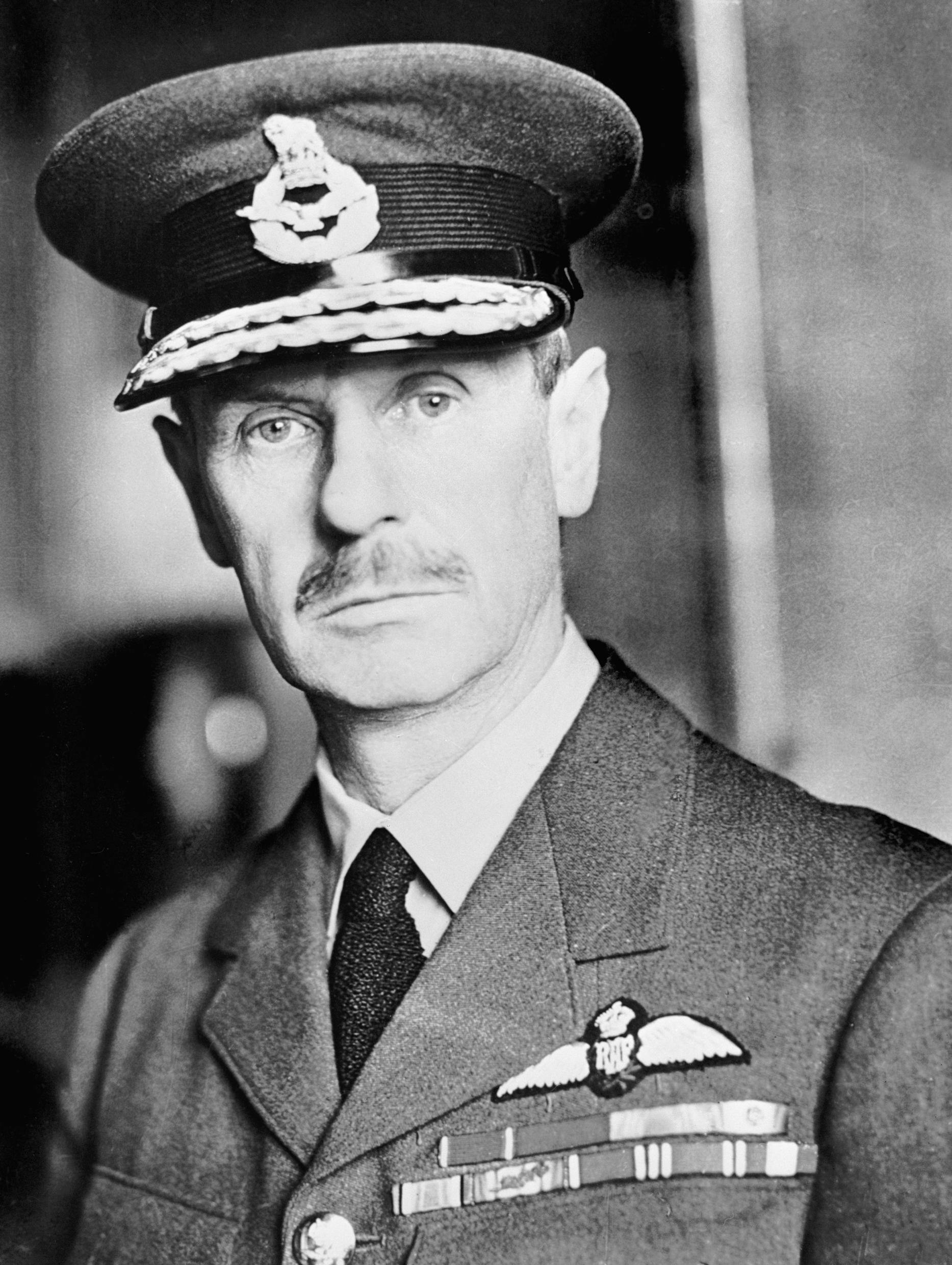
Hugh Dowding was eventually dismissed due to his refusal to implement non-radar solutions to The Blitz, including cat's eye day fighters like the Hurricane shown above.

Through August and September 1940 the Luftwaffe met the Dowding system in the Battle of Britain, and in spite of great effort, failed to defeat Fighter Command. Tizard's letter of 1936 proved prophetic; with their loss during the day, the Luftwaffe moved to a night campaign. The Blitz began in earnest in September. Dowding had been under almost continual criticism from all quarters long before this point; he was still in power after the normal retirement age for officers, had a prickly personality that earned him the nickname "Stuffy", and kept tight-fisted control over Fighter Command. He was also criticized for his inactivity in ending the fight between Keith Park and Trafford Leigh-Mallory, commanders of 11 and 12 Group around London. Nevertheless, he had the favour of Winston Churchill and the demonstrated success of the Battle of Britain, which rendered most complaints moot.

The Blitz changed everything. In September 1940 the Luftwaffe flew 6,135 night sorties, leading to only four combat losses. The Dowding system was incapable of handling night interceptions in a practical manner, and Dowding continued to state that the only solution was to get AI into operation. Seeking alternatives, the Chief of the Air Staff, Cyril Newall, convened a review committee under the direction of John Salmond. Salmond built a heavyweight panel including Sholto Douglas, Arthur Tedder, Philip Joubert de la Ferté, and Wilfrid Freeman.

At their first series of meetings on 14 September, the Night Defence Committee began collecting a series of suggestions for improvements, which were discussed in depth on 1 October. These were passed on to Dowding for implementation, but he found that many of their suggestions were already out of date. For instance, they suggested building new radars that could be used over land, allowing the fight to continue throughout the raid. A contract for this type of radar had already been sent out in June or July. They suggested that the filter room at RAF Bentley Priory be devolved to the Group headquarters to improve the flow of information, but Dowding had already gone a step further and devolved night interception to the Sector level at the airfields. Dowding accepted only four of the suggestions.

This was followed by another report at the request of Churchill, this time by Admiral Tom Phillips. Phillips returned his report on 16 October, calling for standing patrols by Hawker Hurricane fighters guided by searchlights, the so-called cat's eye fighters. Dowding replied that the speed and altitude of modern aircraft made such efforts almost useless, stating that Phillips was proposing to "merely revert to a Micawber-like method of ordering them to fly about and wait for something to turn up". He again stated that AI was the only solution to the problem. Phillips had not ignored AI, but pointed out that "At the beginning of the war, AI was stated to be a month or two ahead. After more than a year, we still hear that in a month or so it may really achieve results."

Dowding's insistence on waiting for AI led directly to his dismissal on 24 November 1940. Many historians and writers, including Bowen, have suggested his dismissal was unwise, and that his identification of AI radar as the only practical solution was ultimately correct. While this may be true, the cat's eye force did result in a number of kills during the Blitz, although their effectiveness was limited and quickly overshadowed by the night fighter force. In May 1941 cat's eye fighters claimed 106 kills to the night fighters' 79, but flew twice as many sorties to do so. Coincidentally a similar system to cat's eye fighters, Wilde Sau, would be arrived at independently by the Luftwaffe later in the war.

=== GCI ===
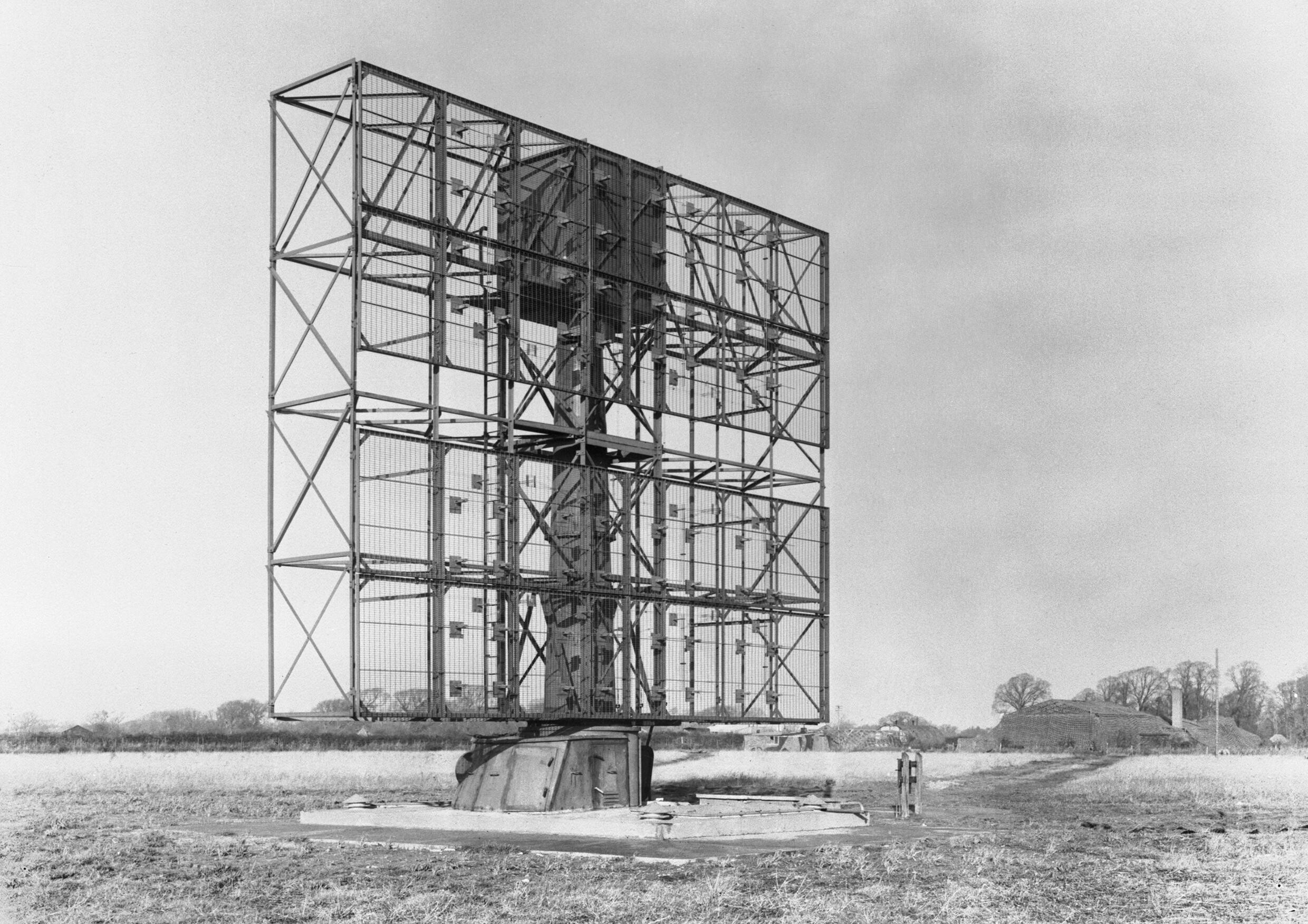
The widespread deployment of the Type 7 GCI radar was key to making the night fighter truly effective.

AI's maximum range remained fixed at the aircraft's altitude, which allowed Luftwaffe aircraft to escape interception by flying at lower altitudes. With a five-mile (8 km) accuracy in the ground direction, that meant anything below 25,000 feet (7.6 km) would be subject to this problem, which accounted for the vast majority of Luftwaffe sorties. The lack of ground-based radar coverage over land was another serious limitation.

On 24 November 1939, Hanbury Brown wrote a memo on Suggestions for Fighter Control by RDF calling for a new type of radar that would directly display both the target aircraft and the intercepting fighter, allowing ground controllers to directly control the fighter without need for interpretation. The solution was to mount a radar on a motorized platform so it rotated continually, sweeping the entire sky. A motor in the CRT display would rotate the beam deflection plates in synchronicity, so blips seen when the antenna was at a particular angle would be displayed at the same angle on the scope display. Using a phosphor that lasted at least one rotation, blips for all targets within range would be drawn on the display at their correct relative angles, producing a map-like image known as a PPI. With both the bombers and fighters now appearing on the same display, the radar operator could now direct an intercept directly, eliminating all of the delays.

The problem was finding a radar that was suitably small; CH radar's huge towers obviously could not be swung about in this fashion. By this time the Army had made considerable progress on adapting the AI electronics to build a new radar for detecting ships in the English Channel, CD, with an antenna that was small enough to be swung in bearing. In 1938, RAF pilots noted they could avoid detection by CH while flying at low altitudes, so in August 1939, Watt ordered 24-CD sets under the name Chain Home Low (CHL), using them to fill gaps in CH coverage. These systems were initially rotated by pedalling on a bicycle frame driving a gear set. A joke of the era "was that one could always identify one of the W.A.A.F. R.D.F. operators by her bulging calf muscles and unusually slim figure". Motorized controls for CHL were introduced in April 1941.

By late 1939 it was realized that the rotation of the beam on the radar display could be accomplished using electronics. In December 1939, G.W.A Dummer began development of such a system, and in June 1940 a modified CHL radar was motorized to continually spin in bearing, and connected to one of these new displays. The result was a 360 degree view of the airspace around the radar. Six copies of the prototype Ground Control Interception radars (GCI) were hand-built at AMES (Air Ministry Experimental Station) and RAE during November and December 1940, and the first went operational at RAF Sopley on New Year's Day 1941, with the rest following by the end of the month. Prior to their introduction in December 1940 the interception rate was 0.5%; by May 1941, with a number of operational GCI stations and better familiarity, it was 7%, with a kill rate of around 2.5%.

=== End of The Blitz ===
It was only the combination of AI Mk. IV, the Beaufighter and GCI radars that produced a truly effective system, and it took some time for the crews of all involved to gain proficiency. As they did, interception rates began to increase geometrically:

- In January 1941, three aircraft were shot down
- In February, this improved to four, including the first kill by a Beaufighter
- In March, twenty-two aircraft were shot down
- In April, this improved to forty-eight
- In May, this improved to ninety-six

The percentage of these attributed to the AI equipped force continued to rise; thirty-seven of the kills in May were by AI equipped Beaus or Havocs, and by June these accounted for almost all of the kills. (Note: White presents a very different list in Appendix IV, which attempts to list individual kills to the night fighter force. The author states this list is not exhaustive, nor meant to be. However, as a relative measure it is still very useful.)

By this point, the Luftwaffe had subjected the UK to a major air campaign and caused an enormous amount of destruction and displacement of civilians. However, it failed to bring the UK to peace talks, nor had any obvious effect on economic output. At the end of May the Germans called off The Blitz, and from then on the UK would be subject to dramatically lower rates of bombing. How much of this was due to the effects of the night fighter force has been a matter of considerable debate among historians. The Germans were turning their attention eastward, and most of the Luftwaffe was sent to support these efforts. Even in May, the losses represent only 2.4% of the attacking force, a tiny number that was easily replaceable by the Luftwaffe. (Note: Combat missions often lose more than 2% of the force due to mechanical problems. During the Libya raid in 1986, over 8% of the aircraft did not complete their mission due to mechanical failure, a rate that is typical.)

=== Baedeker Blitz ===
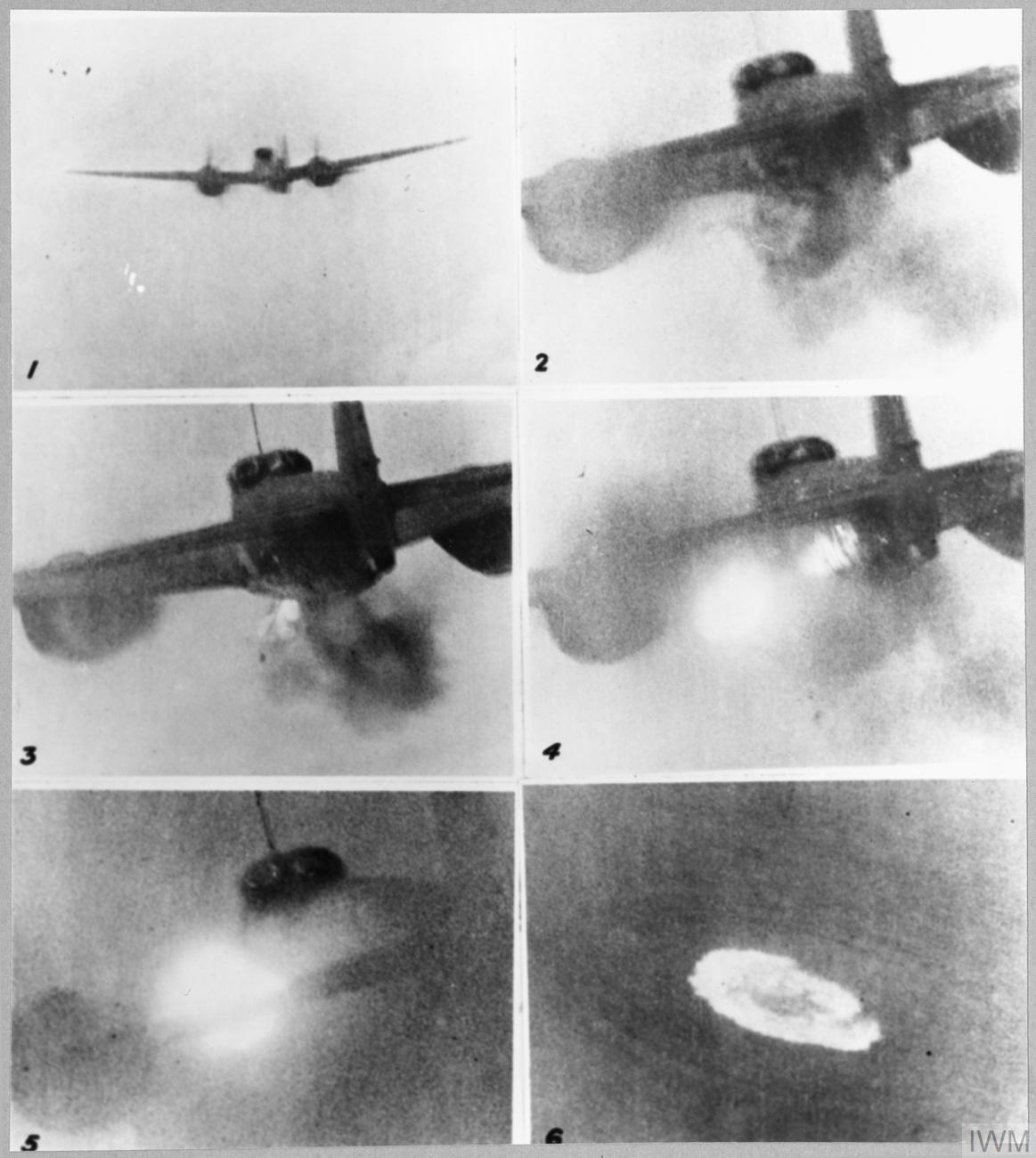
Night fighters were used in bad weather, and were sometimes known as night/all-weather fighters for this reason. This sequence shows a Ju 88 being shot down in bad weather by a Mk. IV-equipped Mosquito NF Mk. II over the Bay of Biscay.

Arthur Harris was appointed Air Officer Commanding-in-Chief of RAF Bomber Command on 22 February 1942, and immediately set about implementing his plan to destroy Germany through dehousing. As part of their move to area attacks, on the night of 28 March a force dropped explosives and incendiaries on Lübeck, causing massive damage. Adolf Hitler and other Nazi leaders were enraged, and ordered retaliation.

On the night of 23 April 1942, a small raid was made against Exeter, followed the next day by a pronouncement by Gustaf Braun von Stumm that they would destroy every location found in the Baedeker tourist guides that was awarded three stars. Raids of ever-increasing size followed over the next week, in what became known in the UK as the Baedeker Blitz. This first series of raids ended in early May. When Cologne was greatly damaged during the first 1,000-bomber raid, the Luftwaffe returned for another week of raids between 31 May to 6 June.

The first raids came as a surprise and were met by ineffective responses. On the first raid a Beaufighter from 604 Squadron shot down a single bomber, while the next three raids resulted in no kills, and the next a single kill again. But as the pattern of the attacks grew more obvious—short attacks against smaller coastal cities—the defense responded. Four bombers were shot down on the night of 3/4 May, two more on 7/8th, one on 18th, two on the 23rd. The Luftwaffe changed their tactics as well; their bombers would approach at low altitude, climb to spot the target, and then dive again after releasing their bombs. This meant that interceptions with the Mk. IV were possible only during the bomb run.

In the end, the Baedeker raids failed to cause any reduction in the RAF's raids over Germany. Civilian losses were considerable, with 1,637 killed, 1,760 injured, and 50,000 homes destroyed or damaged. In comparison to The Blitz this was relatively minor; 30,000 civilians were killed and 50,000 injured by the end of that campaign. Luftwaffe losses were 40 bombers and 150 aircrew. Although the night fighters were not particularly successful, accounting for perhaps 22 aircraft from late April to the end of June, their shortcomings were on the way to being addressed.

=== AIS, replacement ===
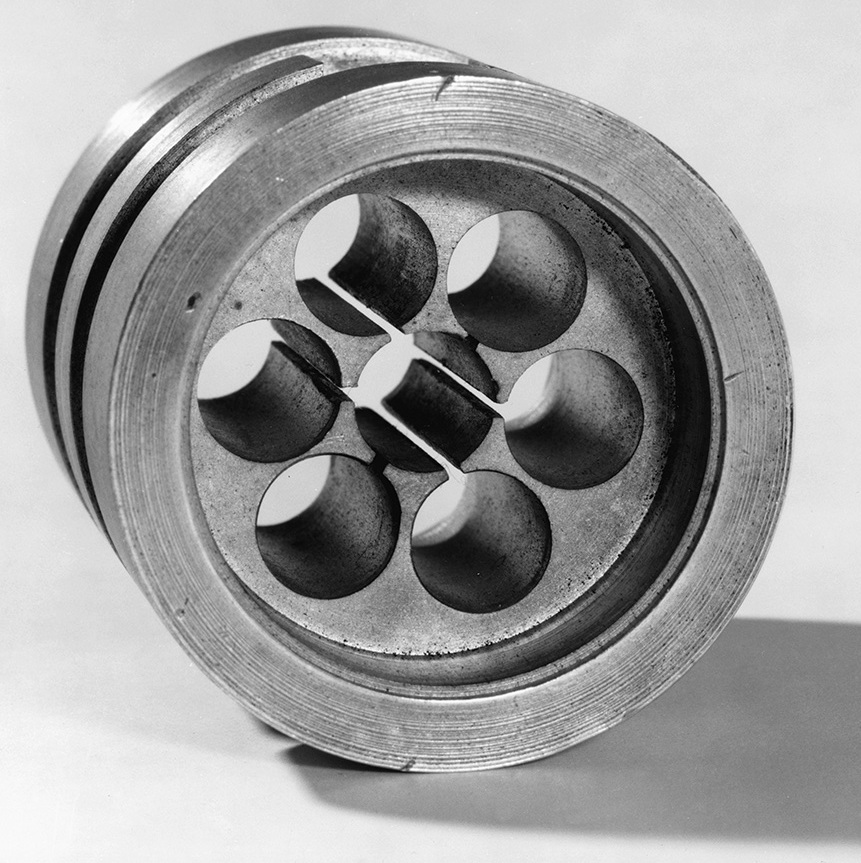
This original magnetron, about 10 cm across, revolutionized radar development.

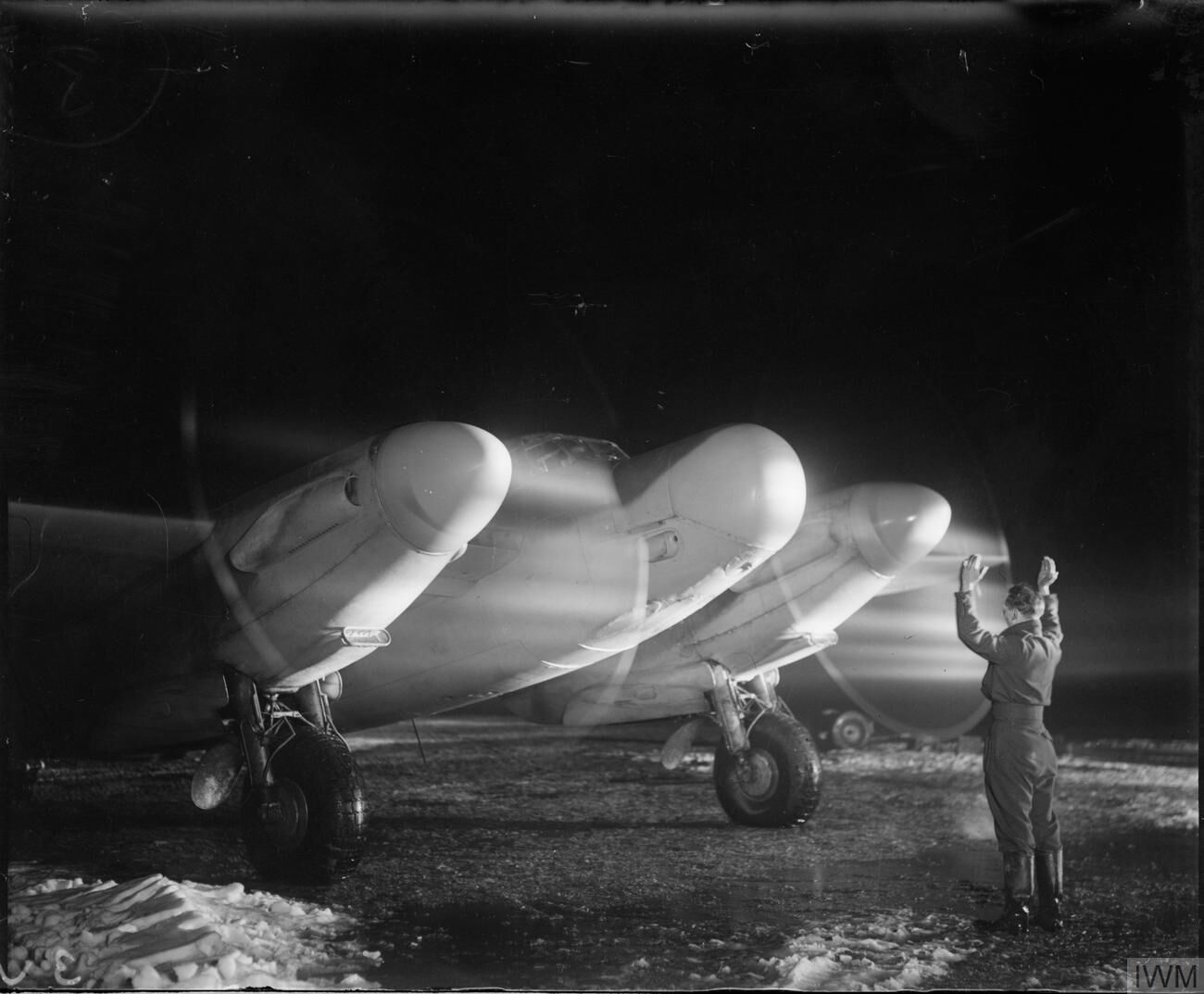
Installed in this oddly-shaped radome on the nose of the Mosquito, SHF S-band radar achieved successes against even the fastest targets.

The Airborne Group had been experimenting with microwave systems as early as 1938 after discovering that a suitable arrangement of the acorn tubes could be operated at wavelengths as short as 30 cm. However, these had very low output, and operated well within the region of reduced sensitivity on the receiver side, so detection ranges were very short. The group gave up on further development for the time being.

Development continued largely at the urging of the Admiralty, who saw it as a solution to detecting the conning towers of partially submerged U-boats. After a visit by Tizard to GEC's Hirst Research Centre in Wembley in November 1939, and a follow-up visit by Watt, the company took up development and developed a working 25 cm set using modified VT90s by the summer of 1940. With this success, Lovell and a new addition to the Airborne Group, Alan Hodgkin, began experimenting with horn-type antennas that would offer significantly higher angular accuracy. Instead of broadcasting the radar signal across the entire forward hemisphere of the aircraft and listening to echoes from everywhere in that volume, this system would allow the radar to be used like a flashlight, pointed in the direction of observation. This would greatly increase the amount of energy falling on a target, and improve detection capability.

On 21 February 1940, John Randall and Harry Boot first ran their cavity magnetron at 10 cm (3 GHz). In April, GEC was told of their work and asked if they could improve the design. They introduced new sealing methods and an improved cathode, delivering two examples capable of generating 10 kW of power at 10 cm, an order of magnitude better than any existing microwave device. At this wavelength, a half-dipole antenna was only a few centimetres long, and allowed Lovell's team to begin looking at parabolic reflectors, producing a beam only 5 degrees wide. This had the enormous advantage of avoiding ground reflections by simply not pointing the antenna downwards, allowing the fighter to see any target at its altitude or above it.

Through this period, Rowe finally concluded that Dundee was unsuitable for any of the researchers, and decided to move again. This time he selected Worth Matravers on the southern coast, where all of the radar teams could once again work together. Due to confused timing and better planning on the part of the AI team, they arrived at Worth Matravers from St Athan before the long convoy from Dundee could make its way south. This caused a traffic jam that further upset Rowe. Nevertheless, everything was set up by the end of May 1940, with the AI team working primarily from huts south of Worth Matravers, and carrying out installations at a nearby airfield. With this move the entire group became the Ministry of Aircraft Production Research Establishment (MAPRE), only to be renamed again as the Telecommunications Research Establishment (TRE) in November 1940.

Soon after the move, Rowe formed a new group under Herbert Skinner to develop the magnetron into an AI system, at that time known as AI, Sentimetric (AIS). Lovell adapted his parabolic antennas to the magnetron with relative ease, and the AIS team immediately detected a passing aircraft when they turned on the set for the first time on 12 August 1940. The next day they were asked to demonstrate the set for managers, but no airplane happened to be flying by. Instead, they had one of the workers bicycle along a nearby cliff carrying a small plate of aluminum sheet. This neatly demonstrated its ability to detect objects very close to the ground. As AIS rapidly developed into the AI Mk. VII, development of the Mk. IV's follow-ons, the Mk. V, and Mk. VI (see below) saw vacillating support.

Considerable additional development of AIS was required, with the first production version arriving in February 1942, and subsequently requiring an extended period of installation development and testing. The first kill by a Mk. VII set was on the night of 5/6 June 1942.

=== Serrate ===
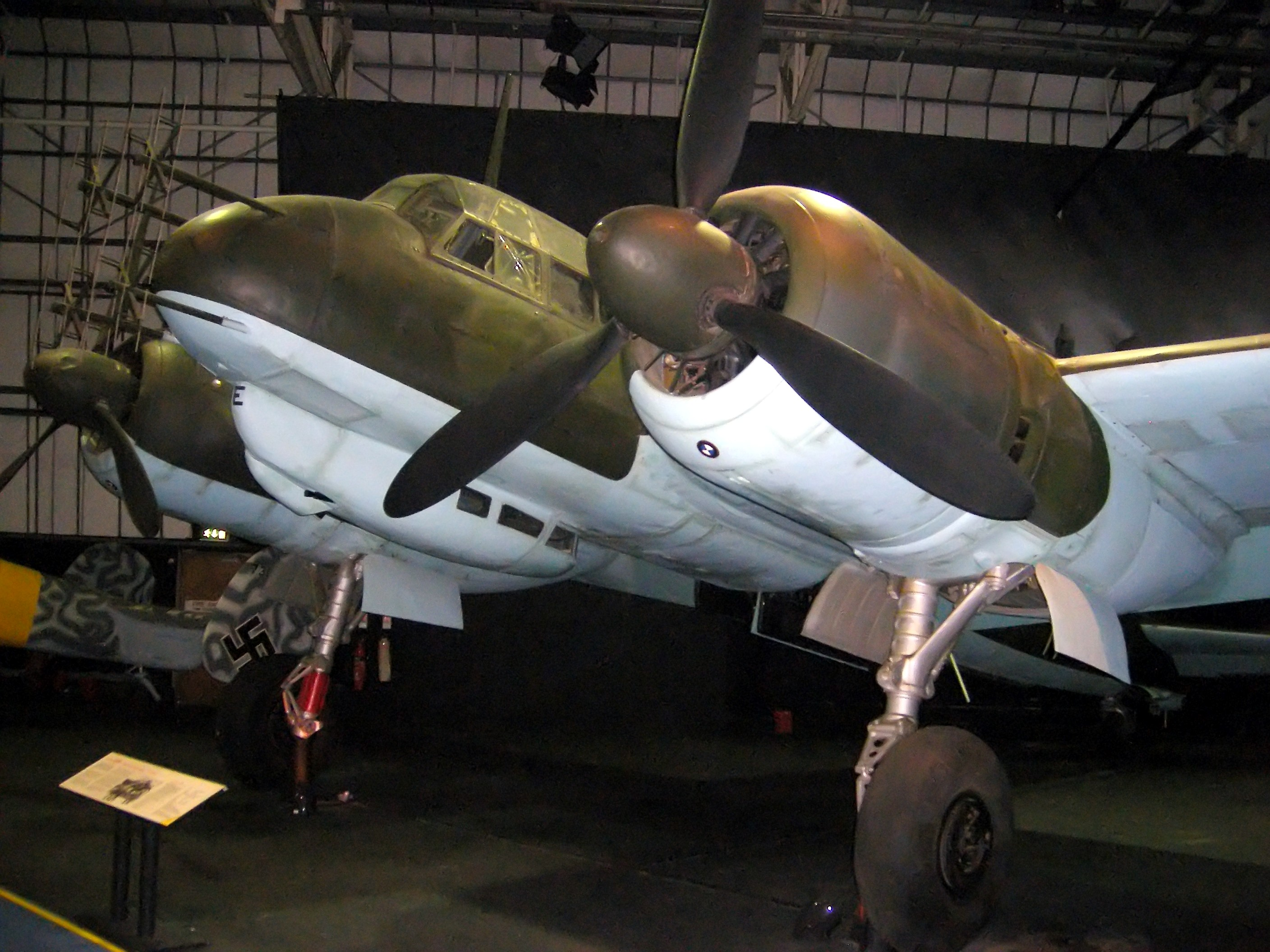
The actual Ju 88R-1 night fighter that revealed the Lichtenstein radar to the RAF, restored and on display

As microwave systems entered service, along with updated versions of aircraft carrying them, the problem arose of what to do with those aircraft carrying Mk. IV that were otherwise serviceable. One possibility, suggested as early as 1942, was homing in on the Luftwaffe's own radar sets. The basic operational frequencies of the Luftwaffe's counterpart to the Mk. IV, the FuG 202 Lichtenstein BC radar, had been discovered in December 1942. On 3 April 1943 the Air Interception Committee ordered the TRE to begin considering the homing concept under the codename Serrate. (Note: The name referred to the serrated edge of the signal as seen on the CRT displays.) As luck would have it, this proved to be perfect timing. In the late afternoon of 9 May 1943, a crew from IV/NJG.3 defected to the UK by flying their fully equipped Ju 88R-1 night fighter, D5+EV, to RAF Dyce in Scotland, giving the TRE their first direct look at the Lichtenstein.

The antenna array of the original Mk. IV was limited by practical factors to be somewhat shorter than the 75 cm that would be ideal for their 1.5 m signals. Lichtenstein operated at 75 cm, making the Mk. IV's antennas almost perfectly suited to pick them up. Sending the signals through the existing motorized switch to a new receiver tuned to the Lichtenstein's frequency produced a display very similar to the one created by the Mk. IV's own transmissions. However, the signal no longer had to travel from the RAF fighter and back again; instead, the signals would only have to travel from the German aircraft to the fighter. According to the radar equation this makes the system eight times as sensitive, and the system displayed its ability to track enemy fighters at ranges as great as 50 miles (80 km).

Homing on the enemy's broadcasts meant that there was no accurate way to calculate the range to the target; radar ranging measurements are based on timing the delay between broadcast and reception, and there was no way to know when the enemy's signal was originally broadcast. This meant that the homing device could only be used for the initial tracking, and the final approach would have to be carried out by radar. The extra range of the Mk. VIII was not required in this role as Serrate would bring the fighter within easy tracking range, and the loss of a Mk. IV would not reveal the secret of the magnetron to the Germans. For this reason, the Mk. IV was considered superior to the newer radars for this role, despite any technical advantages of the newer designs.

Serrate was first fitted to Beaufighter Mk. VIF aircraft of No. 141 Squadron RAF in June 1943. They began operations using Serrate on the night of 14 June, and by 7 September had claimed 14 German fighters shot down for 3 losses. (Note: It appears these three losses were non-combat related, but none of the references state this directly.) The squadron was later handed to No. 100 Group RAF, who handled special operations within Bomber Command, including jamming and similar efforts. Despite their successes, it was clear that the Beaufighter lacked the speed needed to catch the German aircraft and Mosquitoes began to replace them late in 1943.

The Germans became aware of their losses to night fighters, and began a rush program to introduce a new radar operating on different frequencies. This led to the lower-VHF band FuG 220 Lichtenstein SN-2, which began to reach operational units in small numbers between August and October 1943, with about fifty in use by November. In February 1944, 80 Squadron noticed a marked decrease in FuG 202 transmissions. By this time the Germans had produced 200 SN-2 sets, and this had reached 1,000 by May. This set deliberately selected a frequency close to that of their ground-based Freya radar sets, in the hopes that these sources would swamp any wide-band receiver set used on RAF aircraft. Early Serrate units were useless by June 1944, and their replacements were never as successful.

== Further development ==
=== Mk. IVA and Mk. V ===
Experience demonstrated that the final approach to the target required fast action, too quick for the radar operator to easily communicate corrections to the pilot. In 1940, Hanbury Brown wrote a paper On Obtaining Visuals from AI Contacts which demonstrated mathematically that the time delays inherent to the interception system were seriously upsetting the approach. In the short term he suggested the fighters make their approach to dead astern while still 2,500 feet (760 m) out, and then fly straight in. For the longer term, he suggested adding a pilot's indicator that directly demonstrated the direction needed to intercept.

This led to Hanbury Brown's work on the Mark IVA, which differed from the Mk. IV primarily by having an additional display unit in front of the pilot. The radar operator had an additional control, the strobe, which could be adjusted to pick out returns at a particular range. Only those returns were sent to the pilot's display, resulting in much less clutter. Unlike the operator's display, the pilot's showed the target's location as a single dot in a bore-scope like fashion; if the dot was above and to the right of the centre of the display, the pilot had to turn to the right and climb to intercept. The result was what was known as a flying spot indicator, (Note: The flying spot indicator became more widely known after the war as the C-Scope.) a single selected target showing a direct indication of the target's relative position.

Tests were carried out starting in October 1940, and quickly demonstrated a number of minor problems. One of the minor issues is that the crosshairs on the tube that indicated the center would block the spot, making it difficult to see right as the plane began to be properly lined up. A more serious concern was the lack of range information, which the FIU pilots considered critical. Hanbury Brown went to work on these issues, and returned an updated version in December. A U-shaped reticle in the center of the display provided a centre location that left the spot visible. Additionally, the circuitry included a second timebase that produced a longer signal as the fighter approached its target, which was being tracked by the operator moving the strobe. The output was timed so the line was centred horizontally on the dot. This presented the range in an easily understandable fashion; the line looked like the wings of an aircraft, which naturally grow larger as the fighter approaches it.

The U-shaped centring post was sized so the tips of the U were the same width as the range indication line when the target was at 2,500 feet (0.76 km), which indicated that the pilot should throttle back and begin his final approach. Two vertical lines to the sides of the display, the goal posts, indicated that the target was 1,000 feet (300 m) ahead and it was time to look up to see it. Two smaller lines indicated a range of 500 feet (150 m), at which point the pilot should have seen the target, or had to break away to avoid collision.

At a meeting on 30 December 1940, it was decided to begin limited production of the new indicators as an add-on unit for existing Mk. IV systems, creating the AI Mk. IVA. The first examples arrived in January 1941, with more units from ADEE and Dynatron following in early February. Hanbury Brown's involvement with AI came to an abrupt end during testing of the new unit. During a flight in February 1941 at 20,000 feet (6.1 km) his oxygen supply failed and he suddenly awoke in an ambulance on the ground. He was no longer allowed to fly on tests, and moved to working on radar beacon systems.

Continued work displayed a number of minor problems, and the decision was made to introduce a redesigned unit with significant improvements in packaging, insulation, and other practical changes. This would become the AI Mk. V, which began to arrive from Pye in late February and immediately demonstrated a host of problems. By this time the microwave units were being designed, and the Mk. V was almost cancelled. A contract for over 1,000 units was allowed to continue in case of delays in the new units. By May the issues with the Pye design were ironed out, and the FIU's testing revealed it to be superior to the Mk. IV, especially in terms of maintenance. An RAE report agreed.

The first updated Mk. V sets arrived in April 1942 and were fitted to the de Havilland Mosquito as they became available. A Mk. V equipped Mosquito claimed its first kill on 24/25 June, when a Mosquito NF.II from No. 151 Squadron shot down a Dornier Do 217E-4 over the North Sea. In practice it was found that pilots had considerable difficulty looking up from the display at the last minute, and the system was used only experimentally. By this time the microwave units had started to arrive in small numbers, so Mk. V production was repeatedly delayed pending their arrival, and eventually cancelled.

Starting in the summer of 1942 the TRE development team began experimenting with systems to project the display onto the windscreen, and by October had combined this with an image of the existing GGS Mk. II gyro gunsight to produce a true head-up display known as the Automatic Pilot's Indicator, or API. A single example was fitted to a Beaufighter and tested through October, and numerous modifications and follow-on examples were trialled over the next year.

=== Mk. VI ===
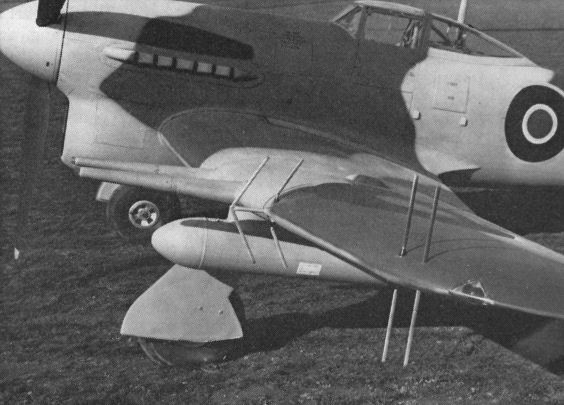
Hawker Typhoon R7881 was experimentally fitted with AI Mk. VI radar. The electronics were packed into the underwing container that looks like a drop tank.

As AI began to prove itself through early 1940 the RAF realised that the radar supply would soon outstrip the number of suitable aircraft available. With large numbers of single-engine single-seat aircraft already in the night fighter units, some way to fit these with radar was desired. The Air Ministry formed the AI Mk. VI Design Committee to study this in the summer of 1940. The resulting AI Mk. VI design was essentially a Mk. IVA with an additional system that automatically set the strobe range. With no target visible, the system moved the strobe from its minimum setting to a maximum range of about 6 miles (9.7 km) and then started over at the minimum again. This process took about four seconds. If a target was seen, the strobe would stick to it, allowing the pilot to approach the target using his C-scope. The pilot would fly under ground control until the target suddenly appeared on his pilot indicator, and then intercept it.

A prototype of the automatic strobe unit was produced in October, along with a new Mk. IVA-like radar unit with a manual strobe for testing. EMI was then asked to provide another breadboard prototype of the strobe unit for air testing, which was delivered on 12 October. A raft of problems were found and addressed. Among these, it was found that the strobe would often stick to the ground reflection, and when it did not, would not stick until it had a strong signal at shorter ranges, or might stick to the wrong target. Eventually a panacea button was added to unstick the strobe in these cases.

As the Mk. IVA was modified into its improved Mk. V, the Mk. VI followed suit. But by early 1941 it was decided to make the Mk. VI an entirely new design, to more easily fit in small aircraft. EMI had already been awarded a contract for a dozen prototype units in October 1940 for delivery in February, but these continued changes made this impossible. Nevertheless, they presented a production contract for 1,500 units in December. Between December and March, production examples began arriving and displayed an enormous number of problems, which the engineers worked through one-by one. By July the systems were ready for use, and began being installed in the new Defiant Mk. II early in August, but these demonstrated a problem where the system would lock-on to transmissions from other AI aircraft in the area, which resulted in further modifications. It was not until the beginning of December 1941 that these issues were fully solved and the units were cleared for squadron use.

By this point, supplies of the Beaufighter and the new Mosquito had improved dramatically, and the decision was made to remove all single-engine designs from the night fighter force during 1942. Two Defiant units did switch to the Mk. VI, but they operated for only about four months before converting to the Mosquito. Production for the AI role ended, and the electronics were converted to Monica tail warning radars for the bomber force, until the mid-1944 knowledge of the Germans' Flensburg radar detector, which spotted Monica transmissions, was revealed to the British.

The Mk. VI had a brief overseas career. One of the early units was experimentally fitted to a Hurricane Mk. IIc, and this led to a production of a single flight of such designs starting in July 1942. These conversions were given such a low priority that they were not complete until the spring of 1943. Some of these aircraft were sent to Calcutta where they claimed a number of Japanese bombers. An experimental fit on Hawker Typhoon iA R7881 was carried out, with the system packed into a standard underwing drop tank. This was available in March 1943 and underwent lengthy trials lasting into 1944, but nothing came of this work.

== Description ==
The Mk. IV was a complex lash-up of systems, known collectively in the RAF as the Airborne Radio Installation 5003 (ARI 5003). Individual parts included the R3066 or R3102 receiver, T3065 transmitter, Modulator Type 20, Transmitter Aerial Type 19, Elevation Aerial Type 25, Azimuth Aerial Type 21 and 25, Impedance Matching Unit Type 35, Voltage Control Panel Type 3, and Indicator Unit Type 20 or 48.

=== Antenna layout ===
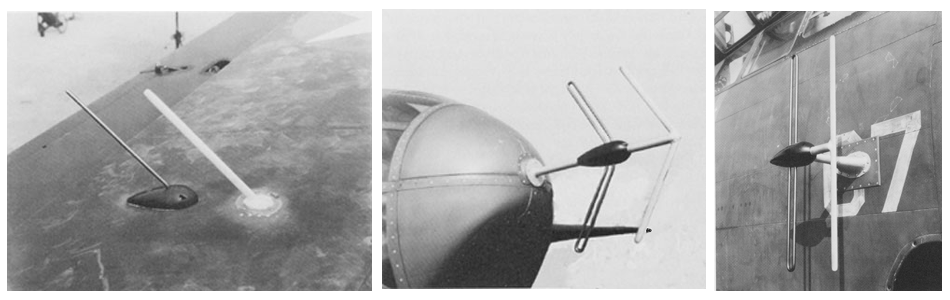
These images show the receiving antennas of the SCR-540 installed on a prototype A-20. The −540 was the US model of the AI Mk. IV, differing primarily in the positioning of the passive directors (white).

As the Mk. IV system worked on a single frequency, it naturally lent itself towards the Yagi antenna design, which had been brought to the UK when the Japanese patents were sold to the Marconi Company. "Yagi" Walters developed a system for AI use using five Yagi antennas.

Transmissions took place from a single arrowhead antenna mounted on the nose of the aircraft. This consisted of a folded dipole with a passive director in front of it, both bent rearward at about 35 degrees, projecting from the nosecone on a mounting rod. For vertical reception, the receiver antennas consisted of two half-wave unipoles mounted above and below the wing, with a reflector behind them. The wing acted as a signal barrier, allowing the antennas to see only the portion of the sky above or below the wing as well as directly in front. These antennas were angled rearward at the same angle as the transmitter. The horizontal receivers and directors were mounted on rods projecting from the leading edge of the wing, the antennas aligned vertically. The fuselage and engine nacelles formed the barriers for these antennas.

All four receiver antennas were connected via separate leads to a motorized switch that selected each one of the inputs in turn, sending it into the amplifier. The output was then switched, using the same system, to one of four inputs into the CRTs. The entire radar dipole aerial setup for the AI Mk.IV was simple in comparison to the 32-dipole Matratze (mattress) transceiving array fitted to the noses of the earliest German night fighters to use AI radar, for their own UHF-band Lichtenstein B/C airborne radar design from 1942 to 1943.

=== Displays and interpretation ===
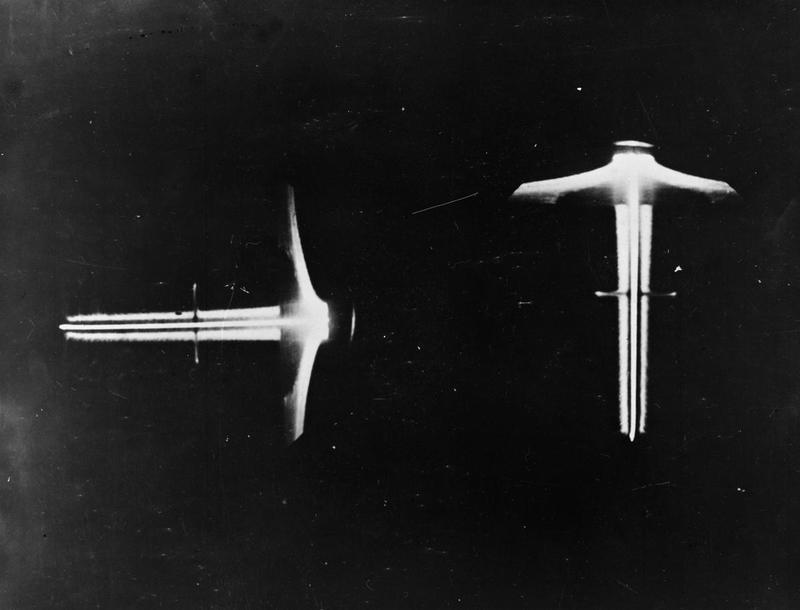
An image of a Mk. IV display with a single target blip just visible about halfway along the timebase. The blips are equally long on the left display and slightly longer on the right side of the right display. This means the fighter should turn slightly to the right to intercept the target. The large triangle shape on the left and top is the ground reflection that limited maximum range.

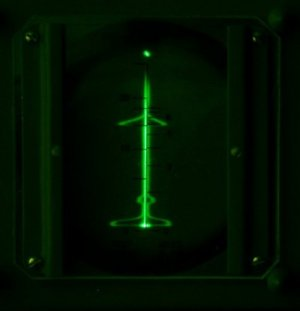
Two blips are visible on this simulated Mk. IV azimuth display, one large and one small. At the bottom is the signal from the ringing that caused the system to have a minimum range. The ground reflections are not simulated.

The Mk. IV display system consisted of two 3-inch (7.6 cm) diameter CRTs connected to a common timebase generator normally set to cross the display in the time it would take to receive a signal from 20,000 feet (6.1 km). The displays were installed beside each other at the radar operator's station at the rear of the Beaufighter. The tube on the left showed the vertical situation (altitude) and the one on the right showed the horizontal situation (azimuth).

Each receiver antenna was sent to one of the channels of the displays in turn, causing one of the displays to refresh. For instance, at a given instant the switch might be set to send the signal to the left side of the azimuth display. The timebase generator was triggered to start sweeping the CRT dot up the screen after the transmission ended. Reflections would cause the dot to be deflected to the left, creating a blip whose vertical location could be measured against a scale to determine range. The switch would then move to the next position and cause the right-hand side of the display to be redrawn, but the signal inverted so the dot moved to the right. The switching occurred fast enough that the display looked continuous.

Because each antenna was aimed to be sensitive primarily in a single direction, the length of the blips depended on the position of the target relative to the fighter. For instance, a target located 35 degrees above the fighter would cause the signal in the upper vertical receiver to be maximized, causing a long blip to appear on the upper trace, and none on the lower trace. Although less sensitive directly forward, both vertical antennas could see directly in front of the fighter, so a target located dead ahead caused two slightly shorter blips, one on either side of the centreline.

For interception, the radar operator had to compare the length of the blips on the displays. If the blip was slightly longer on the right than left side of the azimuth display, for instance, he would instruct the pilot to turn right in an effort to centre the target. Interceptions normally resulted in a stream of left/right and up/down corrections while reading out the (hopefully) decreasing range.

The trailing edge of the transmitter pulse was not perfectly sharp and caused the receiver signals to ring for a short time even if they were turned on after the pulse was ostensibly complete. This leftover signal caused a large permanent blip known as the transmitter break through which appeared at the short-range end of the tubes (left and bottom). A control known as the Oscillator Bias allowed the exact timing of the receiver's activation relative to the transmitter pulse to be adjusted, normally so the remains of the pulse were just visible.

Due to the wide pattern of the transmission antenna, some of the signal always hit the ground, reflecting some of it back at the aircraft to cause a ground return. This was so powerful that it was received on all of the antennas, even the upper vertical receiver which would otherwise be hidden from signals below it. As the shortest distance, and thus the strongest signal, was received from reflections directly below the aircraft, this caused a strong blip to appear across all the displays at the range of the fighter's altitude. The ground further in front of the aircraft also caused returns, but these were increasingly distant (see slant range) and only some of the signal was reflected back at the aircraft while an increasing portion was scattered forward and away. Ground returns at further distances were thus smaller, resulting in a roughly triangular series of lines at the top or right side of the displays, known as the "Christmas tree effect", beyond which it was not possible to see targets.

=== Serrate operation ===
Serrate used the Mk. IV equipment for reception and display, replacing only the receiver unit. This could be switched in or out of the circuit from the cockpit, which turned off the transmitter as well. In a typical interception, the radar operator would use Serrate to track the German fighter, using the directional cues from the displays to direct the pilot on an intercept course. Range was not supplied, but the operator could make a rough estimate by observing the signal strength and the way the signals changed as the fighter maneuvered. After following Serrate to an estimated range of 6,000 feet (1.8 km), the fighter's own radar would be turned on for the final approach.

=== IFF use ===
Starting in 1940, British aircraft were increasingly equipped with the IFF Mk. II system, which allowed radar operators to determine whether a blip on their screen was a friendly aircraft. IFF was a responder (Note: In UK parlance, a transponder transmits on a different frequency than the trigger signal, while a responder transmits on the same frequency.) that sent out a pulse of radio signal immediately on reception of a radio signal from a radar system. The IFF's transmission mixed with the radar's own pulse, causing the blip to stretch out in time from a small peak to an extended rectangular shape.

The rapid introduction of new types of radars working on different frequencies meant the IFF system had to respond to an ever-increasing list of signals, and the direct response of the Mk. II required an ever-increasing number of sub-models, each turned to different frequencies. By 1941 it was clear that this was going to grow without bound, and a new solution was needed. The result was a new series of IFF units which used the indirect interrogation technique. These operated on a fixed frequency, different from the radar. The interrogation signal was sent from the aircraft by pressing a button on the radar, which caused the signal to be sent out in pulses synchronized to the radar's main signal. The received signal was amplified and mixed into the same video signal as the radar, causing the same extended blip to appear.

=== Homing systems ===
Transponder systems used on the ground provide the ability to home in on the transponder's location, a technique that was widely used with the Mk. IV, as well as many other AI and ASV radar systems.

Homing transponders are similar to IFF systems in general terms, but used shorter pulses. When a signal was received from the radar, the transponder responded with a short pulse on the same frequency, the original radar pulse would not be reflected so there was no need to lengthen the signal as in the case of IFF. The pulse was sent to the Mk. IV's display and appeared as a sharp blip. Depending on the location of the transponder relative to the aircraft, the blip would be longer on the left or right of the azimuth display, allowing the operator to guide the aircraft to the transponder using exactly the same methods as a conventional aircraft intercept.

Due to the physical location of the transponder, on the ground, the receiver antenna with the best view of the transponder was the one mounted under the wing. The radar operator would normally pick up the signal on the lower side of the elevation display, even at very long distances. Since the signal from the beacon was quite powerful, the Mk. IV included a switch that set the timebase to 60 miles (97 km) for long-distance pickup. Once they approached the general area, the signal would be strong enough to begin to appear on the azimuth (left-right) tube.

=== BABS ===
Another system used with the Mk. IV was the Beam-Approach Beacon System, or BABS, which indicated the runway centreline.

The general concept pre-dated the Mk. IV and was essentially a UK version of the German Lorenz beam system. Lorenz, or Standard Beam Approach as it was known in the UK, used a single transmitter located off the far end of the active runway that was alternately connected to one of two slightly directional antennas using a motorized switch. The antennas were aimed so they sent their signals to the left and right of the runway, but their signals overlapped down the centreline. The switch spent 0.2 seconds connected to the left antenna (as seen from the aircraft) and then 1 second on the right.

To use Lorenz, a conventional radio was tuned to the transmission, and the operator would listen for the signal and try to determine if they heard dots or dashes. If they heard dots, the short 0.2 s pulse, they would know they were too far to the left, and turned to the right in order to reach the centreline. Dashes indicated they should turn left. In the centre the receiver could hear both signals, which merged to form a steady tone, the equisignal.

For BABS, the only change was to change the broadcast's transmissions to a series of short pulses rather than a continuous signal. These pulses were sent out when triggered by the AI radar's signals and were powerful enough that they could be picked up by the Mk. IV receiver within a few miles. On reception, the Mk. IV would receive either the dots or dashes, and the operator would see an alternating series of blips centred in the display, popping out and then disappearing as the BABS antennas switched. The duration of the blip indicated whether the aircraft was to the left or right, and became a continuous blip on the centreline. This technique was known as AI beam approach (AIBA).

Due to it being based on the same basic equipment as the original Mk. IV AI, BABS could also be used with the Rebecca equipment, originally developed to home on ground transponders for dropping supplies over occupied Europe. The later Lucero unit was essentially an adapter for a Rebecca receiver, mating it to any existing display; AI, ASV, or H2S.

== See also ==
- Air warfare of World War II
- European theatre of World War II
- History of radar
- Turbinlite
- Air Ministry Experimental Station (AMES)
