= Time base generator =

A time base generator (also timebase or time base) is a special type of function generator, an electronic circuit that generates a varying voltage to produce a particular waveform. Time base generators produce very high frequency sawtooth waves specifically designed to deflect the beam of a cathode ray tube (CRT) smoothly across the face of the tube and then return it to its starting position.

Time bases are used by radar systems to determine range to a target, by comparing the current location along the time base to the time of arrival of radio echoes. Analog television systems using CRTs had two time bases, one for deflecting the beam horizontally in a rapid movement, and another pulling it down the screen 60 times per second. Oscilloscopes often have several time bases, but these may be more flexible function generators able to produce many waveforms as well as a simple time base.

== Description ==
A basic oscilloscope typically employs a time base generator, which is controlled with the top dial, while the bottom dial controls the amplification of the signal.

A cathode ray tube (CRT) consists of three primary parts, the electron gun that provides a stream of accelerated electrons, the phosphor-covered screen that lights up when the electrons hit it, and the deflection plates that use magnetic or electric fields to deflect the electrons in-flight and allows them to be directed around the screen. It is the ability for the electron stream to be rapidly moved using the deflection plates that allows the CRT to be used to display very rapid signals, like those of a television signal or to be used for radio direction finding (see huff-duff).

Many signals of interest vary over time at a very rapid rate, but have an underlying periodic nature. Radio signals, for instance, have a base frequency, the carrier, which forms the basis for the signal. Sounds are modulated into the carrier by modifying the signal, either in amplitude (AM), frequency (FM) or similar techniques. To display such a signal on an oscilloscope for examination, it is desirable to have the electron beam sweep across the screen so that the electron beam cycles at the same frequency as the carrier, or some multiple of that base frequency.

This is the purpose of the time base generator, which is attached to one of the set of deflection plates, normally the X axis, while the amplified output of the radio signal is sent to the other axis, normally Y. The result is a visual re-creation of the original waveform.

=== Use in radar ===
A typical radar system broadcasts a short pulse of radio signal and then listens for echoes from distant objects. As the signal travels at the speed of light and has to travel to the target object and back, the distance to the target can be determined by measuring the delay between the broadcast and reception, multiplying the speed of light by that time, and then dividing by two (there and back again). As this process occurs very rapidly, a CRT is used to display the signal and look for the echoes.

In the simplest version of a radar display, today known as an "A-scope", a time base generator sweeps the display across the screen so that it reaches one side at the time when the signal has travelled the radar's maximum effective distance. For instance, an early warning radar like Chain Home (CH) might have a maximum range of 150 kilometres (93 miles), a distance that light will travel out and back in 1 millisecond. This would be used with a time base generator that pulls the beam across the CRT once every millisecond, starting the sweep when the broadcast signal ends. Any echoes cause the beam to deflect down (in the case of CH) as it moves across the display.

By measuring the physical location of the "blip" on the CRT, one can determine the range to the target. For instance, if a particular radar has a time base of 1 millisecond, then its maximum range is 150 km. If this is displayed on a four-inch CRT and the blip is measured to be 2 inches from the left side, then the target is 0.5 milliseconds away, or about 75 kilometres (47 miles).

To ensure the blips would line up properly with a mechanical scale, the time base could be adjusted to start its sweep at a certain time. This could be adjusted manually, or automatically trigged by another signal, normally a greatly attenuated version of the broadcast signal.

Later systems modified the time base to include a second signal that periodically produced blips on the display, providing a clock signal that varied with the time base and thus did not need to be aligned. In UK terminology, these were known as strobes.

=== Use in television ===
Television signals consist of a series of still images broadcast in sequence, in the NTSC standard such a "frame" is broadcast 30 times a second. Each frame is itself broken down into a series of "lines", 525 in the NTSC standard. If one examines a television broadcast on an oscilloscope, it will appear to be a continual sequence of modulated signals broken up by short periods of "empty" signal. Each modulated portion carries the analog image for a single line.

To display the signal, two time bases are used. One sweeps the beam horizontally from left to right at 15,750 times a second, the time it takes for one line to be sent. A second time base causes the beam to scan down the screen 60 times a second, so that each line appears below the last one drawn and then returns to the top. This causes the entire signal of 525 lines to be drawn down the screen, re-creating a 2-dimensional image.

To ensure the time base began its sweep of the screen at the right time, the signal included several special modulations. With each line there was a brief period, the "front porch" and "back porch" that caused the signal to go negative briefly. This triggered the horizontal time base to start its sweep across the screen, ensuring that the lines started on the left of the display. A much longer but otherwise similar signal, the vertical blanking interval caused the vertical time base to start, with any lengthy delay causing the time base to trigger.
