= AI Mark VIII radar =

Type of air-to-air radar

AI Mk. VIII
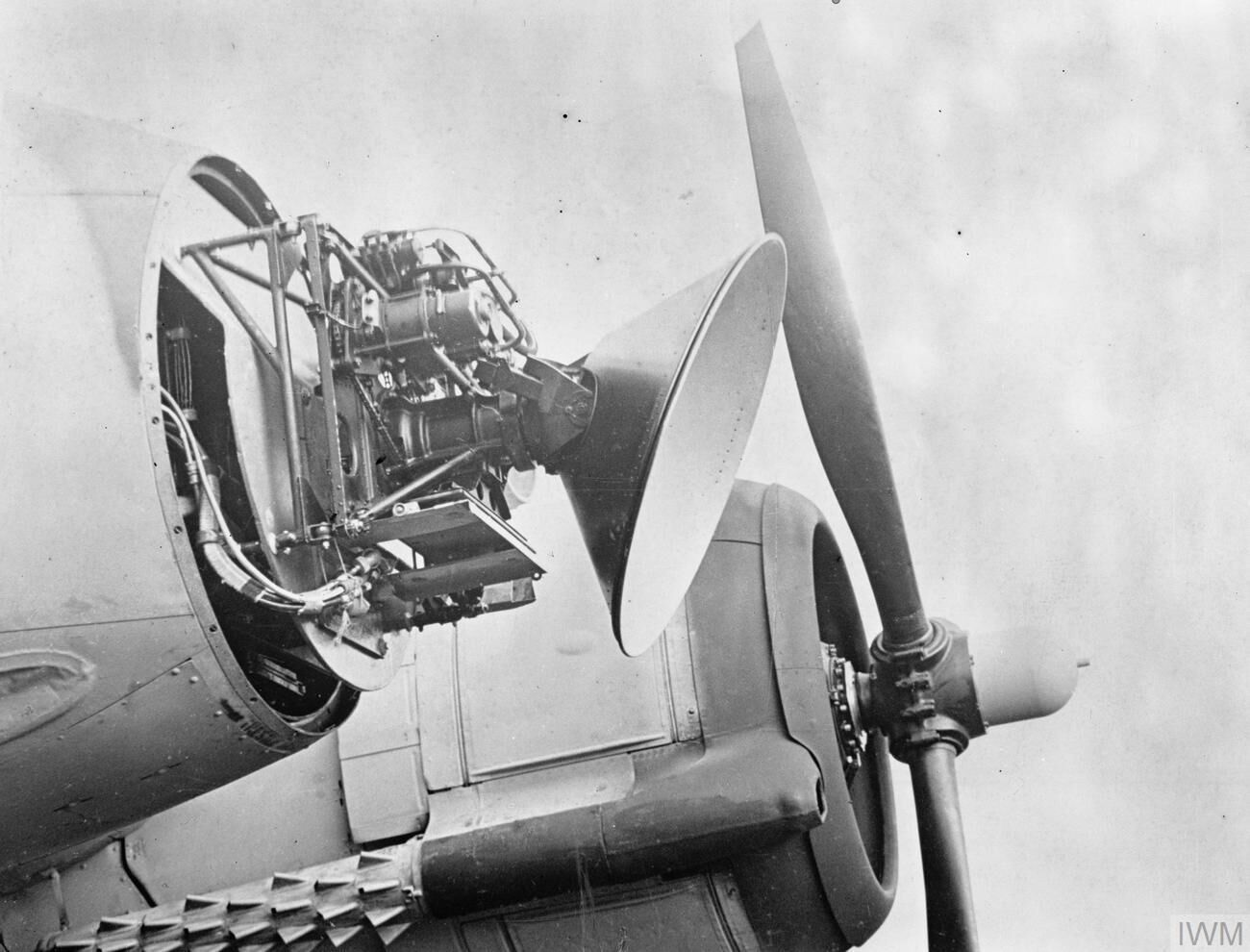
- AI Mk. VIIIA in the nose of a Bristol Beaufighter
- Country of origin: United Kingdom
- Introduced: 1941
- Type: Aircraft interception
- Frequency: 3.3 GHz (S band)
- PRF: 2500 pps (930 for beacons)
- Beamwidth: ~12°
- Pulsewidth: 1 μs (3 μs for beacons)
- RPM: 1020
- Range: 400 to 30,000 ft (120–9,140 m)
- Altitude: 500 ft (150 m) and up
- Diameter: 28 in (71 cm)
- Azimuth: 45° to either side
- Elevation: 45° up and down
- Precision: 1 to 3° ahead, less to the sides
- Power: 25 kW
- Other names: ARI 5093, ARI 5049 (Mk. VII)

Radar, Aircraft Interception, Mark VIII, or AI Mk. VIII for short, was the first operational microwave-frequency air-to-air radar. It was used by Royal Air Force night fighters from late 1941 until the end of World War II. The basic concept, using a moving parabolic antenna to search for targets and track them accurately, remained in use by most airborne radars well into the 1980s.

Low-level development began in 1939 but was greatly sped after the introduction of the cavity magnetron in early 1940. This operated at 9.1 cm wavelength (3 GHz), much shorter than the 1.5 m wavelength of the earlier AI Mk. IV. Shorter wavelengths allowed it to use smaller and much more directional antennas. Mk. IV was blinded by the reflections off the ground from its wide broadcast pattern, which made it impossible to see targets flying at low altitudes. Mk. VIII could avoid this by keeping the antenna pointed just above the horizon, allowing it to see any aircraft at or above the horizon.

The design was just beginning to mature in late 1941 when the Luftwaffe began low-level attacks. A prototype version, the Mk. VII, entered service on the Bristol Beaufighter in November 1941. A small number of these were sent to units across the UK to provide coverage at low altitudes while Mk. IV equipped aircraft operated at higher altitudes. After a small run of the improved Mk. VIIIA, the definitive Mk. VIII arrived in early 1942, offering higher power as well as a host of electronic and packaging upgrades. It arrived just as production rates of the De Havilland Mosquito began to improve, quickly displacing the Beaufighter units in RAF squadrons. Mk. VIII equipped Mosquitoes would be the premier night fighter from 1943 through the rest of the war.

The Mk. VIII spawned a number of variants, notably the AI Mk. IX which included a lock-on feature to ease interceptions. A series of events, including a deadly friendly fire incident, so greatly delayed the Mk. IX that it never entered service. During the late-war period, many UK aircraft adopted the US SCR-720 under the name AI Mk. X. This worked on the same general principles as the Mk. VIII, but used a different display system that offered several advantages. Development of the basic system continued, and the Mk. IX would eventually briefly re-appear in greatly advanced form as the AI.17 during the 1950s.

== Development ==
=== Prior work ===
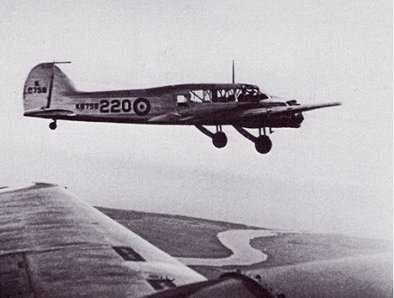
Avro Anson K8758 was used to test radar systems. Its detection of Royal Navy ships in bad weather was the harbinger of the destruction of the German U-boat force.

The seminal Daventry Experiment of 1935 proved the basic concept of radar was feasible and led to the rapid formation of the Air Ministry Experimental Station (AMES) at Bawdsey Manor to develop them. The AMES team's primary concern was the development and deployment of the Chain Home (CH) system, providing early warning for raids approaching the UK. As the team grew, the work diversified, and by 1938 there were a number of teams working on other projects as well.

One of the first of these side efforts came about due to Henry Tizard's concerns about the potential effectiveness of Chain Home. He believed that the Luftwaffe would suffer so stiffly at the hands of the RAF's ground-controlled intercept system that they would switch to the night bombing role. At night, a fighter pilot could see a target at perhaps 1,000 yards (910 m), an accuracy Chain Home and its associated Dowding system could not provide. Tizard's concerns were later brought up by Robert Watson-Watt at a round-table meeting at the Crown and Castle pub. "Taffy" Bowen offered to take up development of a new system able to be installed in aircraft to close the distance between CH direction and visual range at night.

Due to the physics of radio transmission, antennas have to be about as long as the wavelength of the radio signal to achieve reasonable gain. The half-wave dipole, with two poles each about one-quarter the length of the signal, is a particularly common solution. CH operated at anywhere from 10 m to 50 m depending on the version, meaning antennas would have to be at least 5 to 10 metres (16–33 ft) long, which made it totally impractical for use on an aircraft. Bowen started development of a new system operating at shorter wavelengths, first at 6.7 m following work by the British Army, and then finally settling on 1.5 m, the practical limit of available technology. This became known as aircraft interception (AI) radar, and was the primary focus of Bowen's work from 1936 to 1940.

While testing an early 1.5 m set the team failed to detect any aircraft, but easily picked out large objects like cranes and ships at nearby wharves. Further experiments demonstrated the ability to pick up ships at sea, leading to a live demonstration where the team was able to track down Royal Navy capital ships in terrible weather. This led to immediate interest on behalf of RAF Coastal Command which saw this as a way to find enemy ships and U-boats, and by the British Army, which was interested in using the radars to direct fire against shipping in the English Channel. Work on the system for AI use largely ended.

=== AI development ===
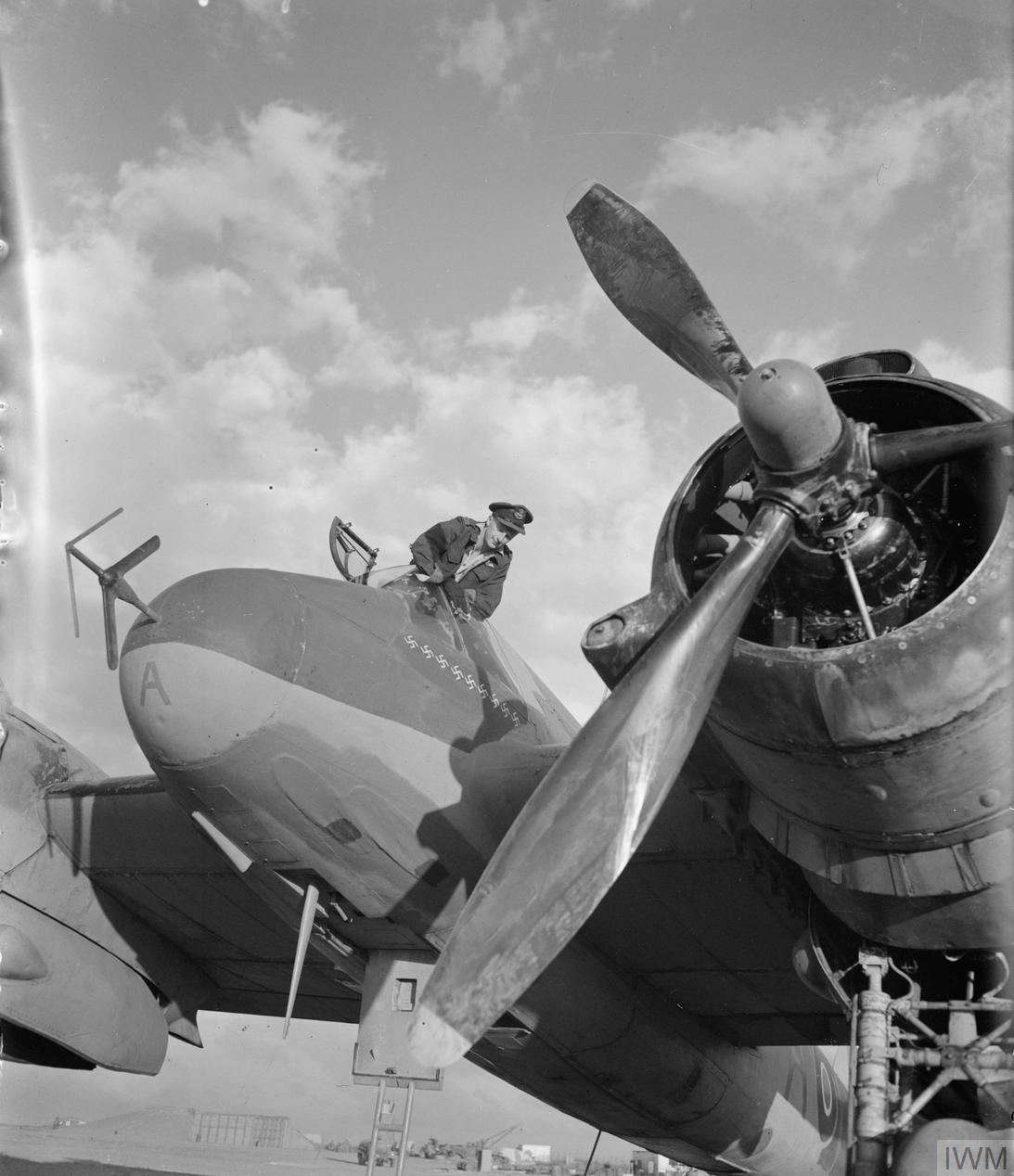
The Bristol Beaufighter equipped with Mk. IV radar was the world's first truly effective night fighter. "Paddy" Green shot down seven Axis aircraft over three nights in this example.

It was not until 1939, with war clearly looming, that the team once again returned to AI work. Compared to the successful and rapid development of the anti-shipping radars, the team found themselves facing a continual stream of problems in air-to-air settings. There were two primary problems, a lack of maximum range that made finding the targets difficult, and a lack of minimum range that made it difficult for the pilot to see the target before it became invisible to the radar.

Like Chain Home, the AI radar sent out a powerful pulse semi-directionally, lighting up the entire sky in front of it. Echoes from aircraft would be received on multiple directional antennas, and by comparing the signal strength from each one, the direction of the target could be determined. However, this also meant that the signal reached the ground and reflected off it, producing a return so powerful that it overwhelmed the receiver no matter where the antenna was positioned. Since this signal had to travel to the ground and back, it produced a line on the display at an indicated range equal to the aircraft's altitude. Flying at 15,000 feet (4.6 km), a typical altitude for German bombers, meant anything beyond about 3 miles (4.8 km) was invisible in the noise. This left little range to detect the target.

A more difficult problem was the inability to detect targets at short range. The transmitter signal was difficult to cut off sharply and was still broadcasting a small signal when the returns from nearby targets started to be received. Moreover, the powerful signal tended to bleed through to the receiver, causing it to oscillate for a time, blanking out nearby targets. These effects limited the minimum range to 800 feet (240 m) in the best case, just at the very limit of the pilot's eyesight at night. Attempts had been made to address this problem, and Bowen and Hanbury Brown were convinced they had a workable solution.

However, the Air Ministry was so desperate to get AI into service that they had used the team as a production facility, having them hand-fit aircraft with the prototype Mk. III units that were nowhere ready for operational use. While these sets were rushed to the squadrons, further work on developing solutions to the "great minimum range controversy" ended. Arthur Tedder would later admit this was a "fatal mistake".

=== Early microwave work ===
The Airborne Group had been experimenting with microwave systems as early as 1938 after discovering that a suitable arrangement of the RCA acorn tubes could be operated at wavelengths as low as 30 cm. However, these had very low output, and on top of this, the receiver's electronics were not very sensitive at these frequencies. This resulted in very short detection ranges, essentially useless. The group gave up on further development for the time being, and Bowen described the topic being pooh-poohed by the engineers for some time.

Nevertheless, pressure from the Admiralty kept microwaves in everyone's mind. While the 1.5 m sets were fine for detecting larger ships, they could not effectively see smaller objects, like U-boat conning towers. This was for the same reason that antennas need to be roughly the size of the wavelength; to provide a reasonable reflection, the objects need to be at several times larger than the wavelength. (Note: The reasons for this are complex, but many are considered as part of the Chu–Harrington limit and antenna factor.) The Admiralty had the advantage of administering the UK's vacuum tube development efforts, under the Communication Valve Development Committee (CVD), and were able to continue development of suitable tubes.

Bowen and his counterpart at the Admiralty Signals Establishment (ASE), Canadian polymath Charles Wright, met at Bawdsey in the spring or summer of 1939 and considered the issue of a microwave aircraft interception radar. Bowen agreed that the main problem with the range limits of the AI sets was the floodlight-like transmissions and that the easy way to fix this would be to narrow the beam, focussing the power into a smaller area. He concluded that a 10-degree beamwidth would do the trick. Considering that the nose of an aircraft could hold a radar antenna about 30 inches (76 cm) across, an antenna with poles shorter than 15 cm was desirable, and if that antenna had to move within the nose for tracking, 10 cm (~3 GHz) would be ideal. This strongly agreed with Wright's requirements for a shipboard system able to detect U-boats while having an antenna small enough to be mounted on small escort vessels.

With both forces desiring a 10 cm system, Tizard visited the General Electric Company's (GEC) Hirst Research Centre in Wembley in November 1939 to discuss the issue. Watt followed up with a personal visit sometime later, leading to a 29 December 1939 contract for a microwave AI radar set. This was followed by the CVD placing a contract for suitable valves with the Birmingham University. Bowen arranged a January meeting between GEC and EMI to coordinate AI work, which led to further collaboration.

The Birmingham group was led by Mark Oliphant, formerly of the Cavendish Laboratory at Cambridge University but recently moved to Birmingham to set up the Nuffield Laboratory. The team decided to base their development efforts on the klystron concept. The klystron had been introduced by the Varian brothers at Stanford University in 1936, but produced a relatively low power output. Oliphant's team began applying new tube making techniques and by the end of 1939 they had a tube capable of delivering 400 watts.

=== AIS begins ===
Watt moved to Air Ministry headquarters in London and Albert Percival Rowe took over management of the radar teams at Bawdsey. He had a troubled relationship with Bowen and many others at AMES. At the opening of the war, the entire AMES establishment was moved from Bawdsey to a pre-arranged location at Dundee. The choice of Dundee was largely due to the university being Watt's alma mater. He had made little effort to prepare the university for use by AMES and the rector was surprised when they arrived one day out of the blue. Almost no room was available as the students and professors had returned from summer holidays. The AI team was sent to a small airfield at Perth that was miles away and quite small. Both locations were totally unsuitable for the work and the teams constantly complained.

In February 1940 Rowe began to organise a new AI team led by Herbert Skinner. (Note: J. Atkinson wrote to Lovell that the work on microwave antennas started at the instigation of George Lee of the Air Ministry, who instructed Rowe to begin research on 10 cm devices in March.) Skinner had Bernard Lovell and Alan Lloyd Hodgkin begin considering the issue of antenna designs for microwave radars. On 5 March they were invited to the GEC labs to view their progress on a radar based on VT90 tubes, which had by this time been pushed to useful power levels at 50 cm wavelengths.

Provided with a low power klystron as a microwave source, Lovell and Hodgkin began experimenting with horn antennas that would offer significantly higher angular accuracy than the Yagi antennas used on the Mk. IV. Instead of broadcasting the radar signal across the entire forward hemisphere of the aircraft and listening to echoes from everywhere in that volume, this system would allow the radar to be used like a flashlight, pointed in the direction of observation. This would also have the side-effect of allowing the radar to avoid ground reflections simply by pointing the antenna away from the ground. With a beamwidth of 10 degrees, a horizontal antenna would still create some downward-pointed signal, about 5 degrees in this case. If the aircraft were flying at 1,000 feet (305 m), the beam would not strike the ground until about 995 feet (303 m) in front of the aircraft, leaving some room for detection against even the lowest flying targets. Lovell was able to build horns with the required 10 degree accuracy, but they were over 1 yard (91 cm) long, making them unsuitable for installation in a fighter.

At the suggestion of Skinner, (Note: J. Atkinson's letter also noted that Skinner had already ordered parabolic dishes in March.) they experimented with a parabolic dish reflector behind a dipole antenna on 11 June 1940. They found it offered similar accuracy, but was only 20 centimetres (7.9 in) deep, easily able to fit within a fighter's nose area. The next day Lovell experimented with moving the dipole back and forth in front of the reflector, and found that it caused the beam to move as much as 8 degrees for 5 cm movement, at which point Lovell regarded "the aerial problem as 75 per cent solved." Follow-up experiments with a production antenna dish from the London Aluminium Company demonstrated the ability to move the beam as much as 25 degrees before it became distorted.

After several months at Dundee, Rowe finally agreed that the accommodations were unsuitable and began plans to move to a new location on the south coast near Worth Matravers. In May 1940, shortly after the breakup of the original AI team, Skinner moved along with a number of scientists from Dundee, as well as former AI team members Lovell and Hodgkin. They settled in huts at St Alban's Head, outside Worth Matravers.

=== Cavity magnetron ===
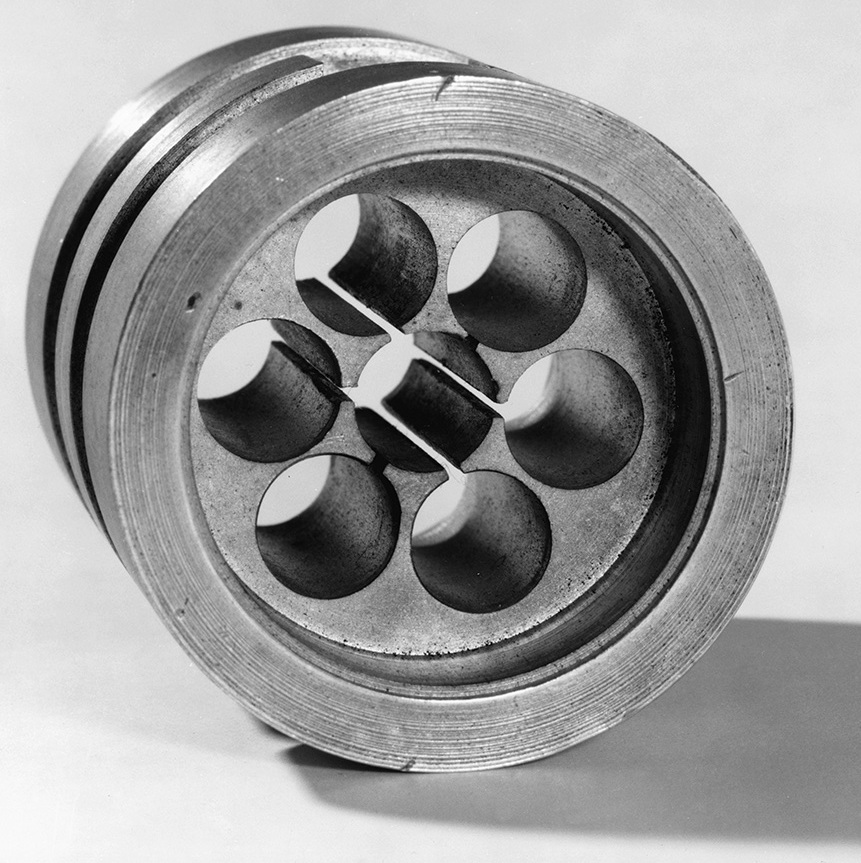
This original magnetron, about 10 cm across, revolutionised radar development.

While Oliphant's group struggled to raise the power of their klystrons, they also looked at alternate arrangements of the device. Two researchers in the team, John Randall and Harry Boot, had been given the task of making one such adaptation, but it quickly became clear it did not help matters. They were left with little to do and decided to consider alternative approaches to the problem.

All microwave generators of the era worked along similar principles; electrons were pulled off a cathode towards an anode at the far end of a tube. Along the way, they passed one or more resonators, essentially hollow copper rings with a slit cut along the inner edge. As the electrons passed the slit, they caused the interior of the ring to begin to resonate at radio frequencies, which could be tapped off as a signal. The frequency could be adjusted by controlling the speed of the electrons (via the applied voltage) or by changing the dimensions of the resonator.

The problem with this approach was producing enough energy in the resonators. As the electron passed the opening in the resonator they deposited some of their energy as radio waves, but only a small amount. To generate useful amounts of radio energy, the electrons either had to pass the resonators multiple times to deposit more energy in total, or huge electron currents had to be used. Single-chamber klystrons, like those being used at the time, had to go the latter route, and were difficult to make in a form with useful output given a reasonable input power.

Randall and Boot began to consider solutions with multiple resonators, but this resulted in very long and entirely impractical tubes. One then recalled that loops of wire with a gap in them would also resonate in the same fashion, an effect first noticed in the very earliest experiments by Heinrich Hertz. Using such loops, one could make a resonator that sat beside the electron stream, instead of being wrapped around it. If the electron beam was then modified to travel in a circle instead of a straight line, it could pass by a series of such loops repeatedly. This would cause much more energy to be deposited in the cavities, while still being relatively compact.

To produce the circular motion, they used another concept known as the magnetron. The magnetron is essentially a diode that uses a magnetic field to control the path of the electrons from cathode to anode instead of the more common solution of an electrically charged grid. This was initially invented as a way to avoid patents on grid-based tubes but proved to be impractical in that role. Follow-up studies had noted the ability of the magnetron to create small levels of microwaves under certain conditions, but only halting development had taken place along these lines.

By combining the magnetron concept with resonator loops created by drilling holes in solid copper, an idea from W. W. Hansen's work on klystrons, the two constructed a model version of what they called the resonant cavity magnetron. They placed it inside a glass enclosure evacuated with an external vacuum pump, and placed the entire assembly between the poles of a powerful horseshoe magnet, which caused the electrons to bend around into a circular path.

Trying it out for the first time on 21 February 1940, the tube immediately began producing 400 W of 10 cm (3 GHz) microwaves. Within days they noticed that it was causing fluorescent tubes to light up across the room. Quick calculations showed this meant the tube was creating about 500 W, already beating the klystrons. They pushed this over 1,000 W within weeks. The main Birmingham team gave up on the klystron and began work on this new cavity magnetron, and by the summer had examples producing 15 kW. In April, GEC was told of their work and asked if they could further improve the design.

=== First magnetron radar ===
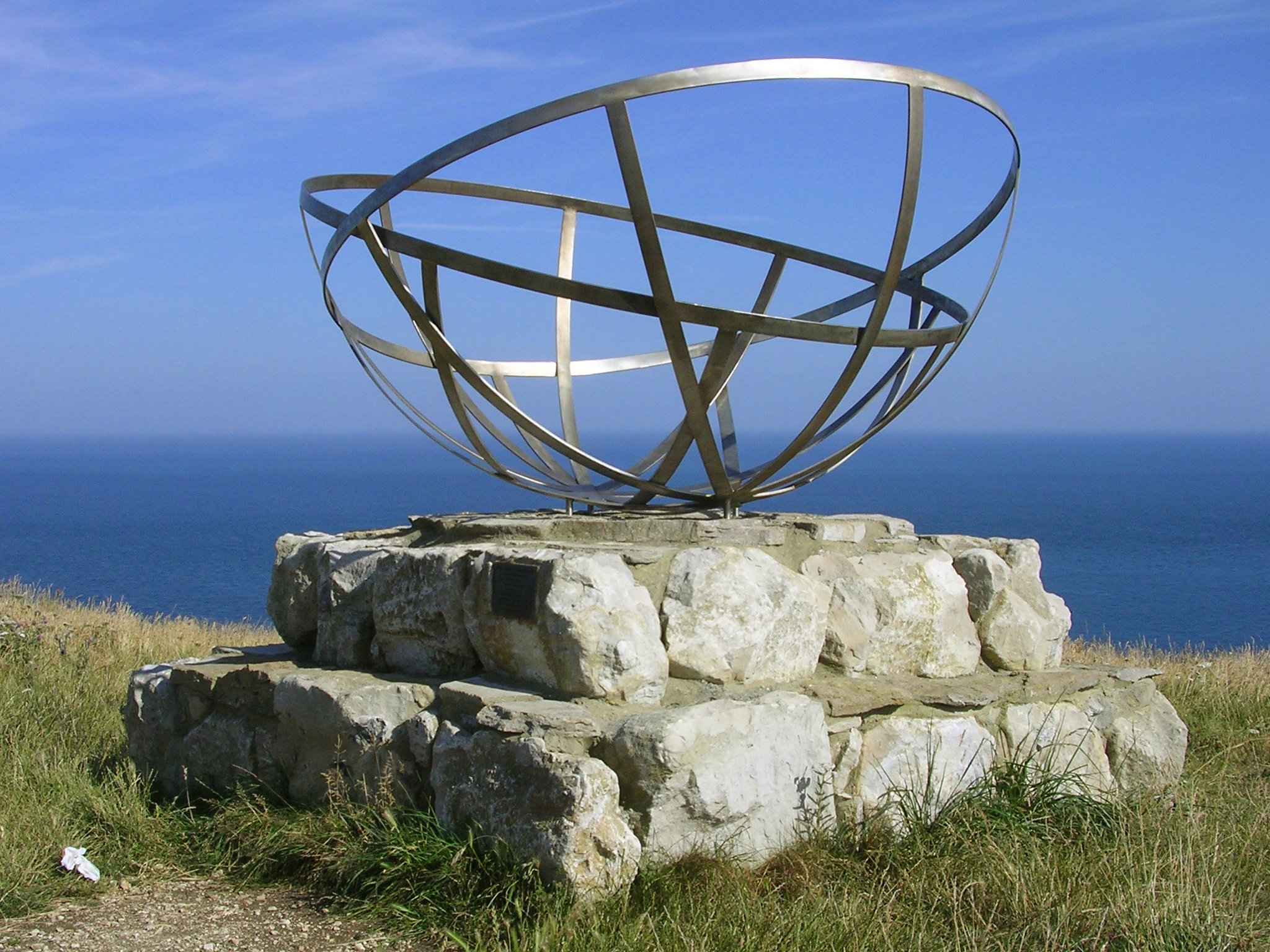
This marker was placed at the former location of AMRE's buildings at St. Alban's Head.

On 22 May, Philip Dee travelled to visit the magnetron lab, but was forbidden to tell anyone else in the AIS group about it. He simply wrote that he had seen the lab's klystron and magnetrons, but failed to detail that the magnetron was an entirely new design. He did provide Lovell with a much more powerful water-cooled klystron to use as a test source for the antenna work, which took place in ramshackle conditions. This was a problematic device because the filaments warming the cathode tended to burn out continually, requiring the system to be disconnected from the water supply, unsealed, repaired, and then re-assembled. Dee's 13 June description notes:

Whenever I am out of the lab, and Skinner has to do this, he forgets to turn off the water before pulling off the cooling pipes with the result that I am standing in 1/2" depth of water, and the water on the bench is about equally deep but has its surface relieved somewhat by floating cig-ends, tea leaves, banana skins, etc.

Skinner also gave Dee fits with his unusual method of testing that the klystron was working properly, by using the output lead to light his cigarettes.

GEC was working on producing a fully sealed version of the magnetron, as opposed to one that used an external vacuum pump. After inventing a new sealing method using gold wire and adapting the chamber of a Colt revolver as a drilling template, they produced the E1188 in early July 1940. This produced the same amount of power as the original Randall-Boot model, about 1 kW at around 10 cm. Within a few weeks they had made two improvements, moving from six to eight resonators, and replacing the cathode with an oxide-coated version. The resulting E1189 was capable of generating 10 kW of power at 9.1 cm, an order of magnitude better than any existing microwave device. The second E1189 was sent to the AMRE lab, which received it on 19 July.

The first E1189 would end up travelling to the US in August as part of the Tizard Mission. By the spring of 1940, Bowen was being increasingly sidelined in the AI field due to his continuing battles with Rowe. Watt, responding to these problems, announced a reorganization of the AI teams, with Bowen left off the roster. Bowen then joined the Tizard Mission, secretly carrying the E1189 in a lockbox until he presented it to great acclaim by the US delegates who had nothing like it. This ultimately caused some confusion, as the supposedly matching blueprints were actually for the original six-chamber version.

Lovell continued his work on the production antenna design using klystrons and wrapped up this work on 22 July. The team then began adapting the various bits of equipment to work together as a single radar unit based on the magnetron. J. R. Atkinson and W. E. Burcham, both sent to the AIS team from the Cavendish Laboratory at University of Cambridge, produced a pulsed power source, and Skinner and A. G. Ward, also from Cavendish, worked on a receiver. At the time the team had no solution to switching the antenna from transmit to receive, so they initially used two antennas side-by-side, one on the transmitter and one on the receiver.

On 8 August they were experimenting with this setup when they received a signal from a nearby fishing hut. With the antenna still pointed in the same direction, they accidentally detected an aircraft which flew by the site at 6 pm on 12 August. The next day, Dee, Watt and Rowe were on hand, but with no convenient aircraft available the team instead demonstrated the system by detecting the returns from a tin sheet being held by Reg Batt bicycling across a nearby cliff. (Note: Lovell specifically states this is a "tin sheet", although this may be a euphemism. Others, including White, state this was aluminium.) With this demonstration of the radar's ability to reject ground returns and detect targets at basically zero altitude, interest in the 1.5 m systems began to wane.

At some point in July or August, Dee was placed in charge of developing a practical 10 cm set, which was now known under the name AIS, S for sentimetric. Dee began complaining to everyone that would listen about the fact that both his team and GEC were developing what was essentially the same solution, AIS using a 10 cm magnetron, and GEC using Micropup tubes which had now been improved to the point where operation at 25 cm was possible. On 22 August 1940 a team from GEC visited the AIS lab, where the AIS team demonstrated the system by detecting a Fairey Battle light bomber at a range of 2 miles (3.2 km) in spite of it being tail-on to the radar. This was far better than the GEC set. Soon after, Rowe received orders from Watt's office telling him to place all AIS development in Dee's hands.

=== GL sideline ===
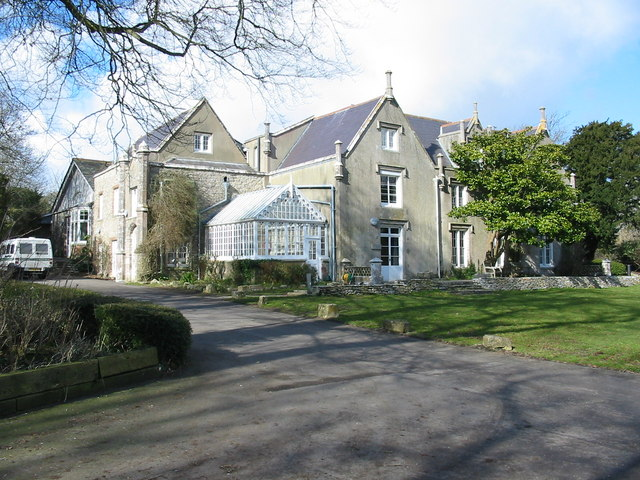
Leeson House was a significant improvement from the huts they formerly occupied, but the AI team was only here for eighteen months before moving once again.

At this point the AI team was moved from their location at St. Alban's to a new one at a former girls' school, Leeson House, outside Langton Matravers. A new lab had to be constructed on-site causing further delays, but by the late summer of 1940 the magnetron system was effectively operational at the new site.

Meanwhile, the Army had been very impressed with the performance of the 25 cm experimental sets and became interested in using it as a range finder in a Gun Laying radar. Operators would point the radar at targets indicated to them by search radars, and from then on the radar information would be fed to the analogue computers that aimed the guns. The limited power of the 25 cm set was not a serious concern in this case as the range would be relatively short and the targets relatively large. The Air Defence Experimental Establishment (ADEE) of the Army was working on this using the klystron design from Birmingham and British Thomson-Houston (BTH) as their industrial partner.

According to Dee, in September 1940 when Rowe heard of this he attempted to take over the project. After a 22 September meeting with Philip Joubert de la Ferte, Rowe built a GL team under the direction of D. M. Robinson using several members of the AIS team, telling them that they would have to focus on the GL problem for the next month or two. This led to increasing friction between Dee and Rowe, and especially Rowe's right-hand-man, Lewis. Dee claimed that Rowe was "seizing this opportunity to try and filch the GL problem from the ADEE" and that "only Hodgkin is carrying on undisturbed with AIS, and Lovell and Ward are fortunately engaged upon basic work with aerials and receivers and are therefore relatively undisturbed by this new flap."

According to Lovell this did not represent as much of a disruption as Dee believed; to some extent, the klystron work at Birmingham had been instigated by the Army for GL purposes, so it was not entirely fair to complain that they were now using it for precisely that purpose. Lovell's primary task during this period was developing a conical scanning system that improved the accuracy of the radar beam many times, enough to allow it to be used directly to lay the guns (that is, about the same accuracy as optical instruments). This did not really require much effort, and would be useful for any centimetric radar, including AIS.

Shortly thereafter, on 21 October, Edgar Ludlow-Hewitt, Inspector General for the RAF, visited the team. After the visit, Rowe told the team that a complete GL set had to be ready for fitting to a gun in two weeks. By 6 November Robinson had assembled a prototype system, but by 25 November he sent a memo to Rowe and Lewis stating that in the last 19 days, the system had only worked for two days due to a wide variety of problems. In December he was told to take the work completed so far to BTH for development into a deployable system. On 30 December 1940, Dee commented in his diary that:

The GL fiasco has ended up with the whole thing being moved en bloc to BTH, including two AMRE staff. Nothing ever worked properly at Leeson and Robinson is feeling that it has been very salutary for Lewis to learn how haywire all the basic technique really is.

Although the project was soon out of the AMRE's hands, development at BTH continued. The Ministry of Supply changed the specification to a magnetron in January 1941, requiring further development but producing a version of much greater range and utility. It was not until 31 May that the first set was delivered for testing, at which point information on the system was turned over to Canadian and US firms for building. The Canadian versions were eventually deployed as the GL Mk. III radar, while the US team at the Radiation Laboratory added an automatic scanning feature to their version to produce the superb SCR-584 radar.

=== Scanning ===
As the AIS team once again returned their attention full-time to the aircraft interception task, they had by this time produced what was a complete radar system. However, the system could only be used in the manner of a flashlight, pointed in the direction of its target. This was fine for gun-laying, but in order to be useful in the interception role, the system had to be able to find the target anywhere in front of the fighter. The team began to consider different ways to scan the radar beam to produce a search function.

The team first considered spinning the radar dish around a vertical axis and then angling the dish up and down a few degrees with each complete circuit. The vertical motion could be smoothed out by moving continually rather than in steps, producing a helix pattern. However, this helical-scan solution had two disadvantages; one was that the dish spent half of its time pointed backwards, limiting the amount of energy broadcast forward, and the other was that it required the microwave energy to somehow be sent to the antenna through a rotating feed. At a 25 October all-hands meeting attended by Dee, Hodgkin and members of the GEC group at GEC's labs, the decision was made to proceed with the helical-scan solution in spite of these issues. GEC solved the problem of having the signal turned off half the time by using two dishes mounted back-to-back and switching the output of the magnetron to the one facing forward at that instant. They initially suggested that the system would be available by December 1940, but as work progressed it became clear that it would take much longer.

As chance would have it, in July 1940 Hodgkin had been introduced to A.W. Whitaker of Nash & Thompson, best known for their work on powered gun turrets. They began to talk about the scanning problem, and Hodgkin described their current solution of moving the dipole at the center of the parabola up and down while moving the parabola itself right and left. Hodgkin was not convinced this was a good solution and was proven correct when Whitaker built their first version of such a system in November. They found that the two motions combined to cause enormous vibrations in the entire system. Lovell and Hodgkin considered the problem and came up with the idea of causing the parabolic reflector to rotate around the axis extending from the nose of the aircraft, tracing out circles. By smoothly increasing the angle of the reflector compared to the forward axis while the circular motion continued, the net effect was a spiral scanning pattern. Whitaker was able to rapidly build such a system, scanning out a cone-shaped area 45 degrees on either side of the nose. (Note: The conical area created by the scanner should not be confused with the conical scanning system that is used to improve accuracy. They ultimately both use the same underlying scanning pattern, but the latter is limited to a few degrees on either side of the scanner's current pointing angle.)

The spiral and helical scan systems produced very different displays from the same basic data. With the helical-scan system, the radar dish was moving horizontally, producing a series of stripes across the screen while scanning up and down so subsequent lines were above or below the last pass. This created a raster scan display, not unlike a television. Echoes caused the signal to brighten, producing a spot, or blip on the display. The blip's location indicated the direction to the target relative the nose of the fighter, represented by the centre point of the display. The further the blip was from the centre of the screen, the further away the target was from the centreline. The range was not directly indicated in this sort of display.

In contrast, the spiral-can system was essentially a rotating version of a conventional A-scope display. In the A-scope, a time base generator pulls the CRT beam across the screen horizontally, and blips indicate the range to the target along the line the radar is currently pointed. For spiral-scan the only difference was that the line was no longer always horizontal, but was rotating around the face of the display at the same speed as the dish. Blips on the screen now indicated two values, the angle of the target relative to the centreline, and the range to the target represented by the distance from the centre. What was lost in this display was a direct indication of magnitude of the angle from the centre; a blip to the upper right indicated the target was in that direction but did not directly indicate if it was five, ten or twenty degrees off.

It was later realised that the spiral-scan did provide angle-off information, through simple geometry and timing. Since the radar beam had a finite width, about five degrees, it would see some return even when the target was not centred in the beam. A target far from the centreline would only be illuminated when the dish was pointed in that direction while rotating rapidly away from it. The result as a short arc on the display about 10 degrees long. A target closer to the centre, say five degrees to port, would be illuminated strongly when the dish was pointed to the left, but still receive a small signal even when it was pointed to the right. That meant it produced a varying return almost through the entire rotation, creating a much longer arc, or a complete circle if the target was dead ahead.

=== Continued development ===
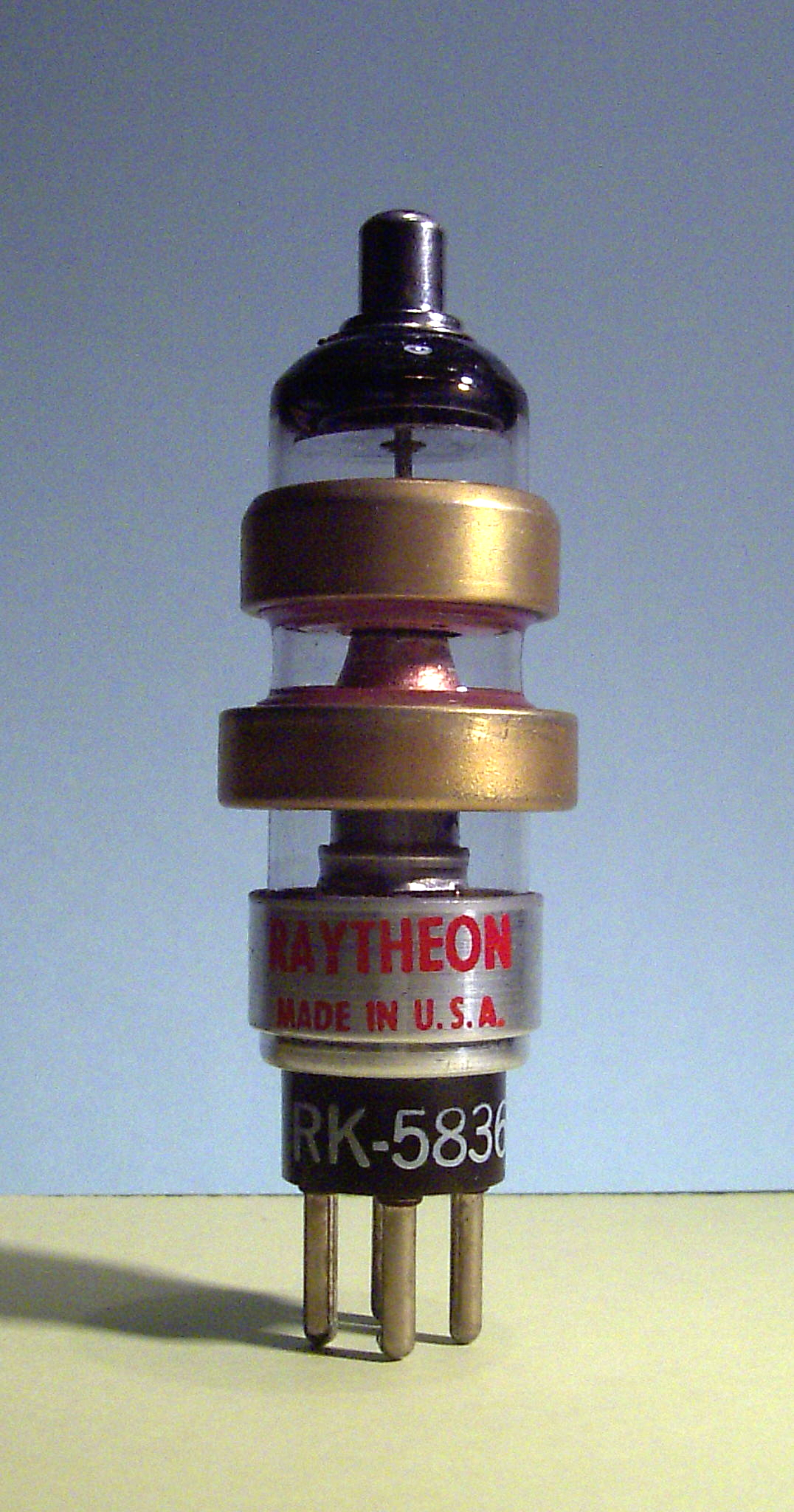
The Sutton tube ultimately solved two thorny problems for the AIS team, acting as both a local oscillator as well as a high-speed switch.

Awaiting the arrival of a scanner, in the autumn of 1940 the AMRE had ordered the delivery of an aircraft with some sort of radio-transparent nose. The Indestructo Glass company proposed using 8 millimetres (0.31 in) thick Perspex, while the AMRE team preferred a composite material of polystyrene fabric and Egyptian cotton bound with phenol formaldehyde resin (the glue used in Bakelite), or a similar paper-based resin composite. The Perspex solution was chosen, and in December 1940 Bristol Blenheim N3522, a night fighter adaptation of the Blenheim V, arrived at RAF Christchurch, the nearest suitable airfield. A number of attempts had to be made to successfully mount the nose to their test aircraft. It was not until the spring of 1941 that Indestructo delivered suitable radomes and the mounting issues were wholly solved.

While this work progressed, the teams continued development of the basic system. Burcham and Atkinson continued their development of the transmitter section, attempting to generate very short pulses of power to feed the magnetron. They finally settled on a solution using two tubes, a thyratron and a pentode, which produced 1 μs pulses at 15 kW. GEC preferred a design using a single thyratron, but this was eventually abandoned in favour of the AMRE design. Further work pushed this system to 50 kW, producing 10 kW of microwaves at a pulse repetition frequency of 2500 cycles per second.

Skinner took up the task of developing a suitable crystal detector, which essentially consisted of endless trials of different crystals; Lovell noted that "an abiding memory of the days at Worth and Leeson is of Skinner, cigarette drooping from his mouth, totally absorbed in the endless tapping of a crystal with his finger until the whisker found the sensitive spot giving the best characteristics." This led to the use of a tungsten whisker on silicon glass, sealed into a wax-filled glass tube. Oliphant's team in Birmingham continued these experiments and developed a capsule-sealed version.

The radio receiver turned out to be a more difficult problem. Early on they decided to use the same basic receiver system as the earlier Mk. IV radar. This had originally been a television receiver designed by Pye Ltd. to pick up BBC transmissions on 45 MHz. It was adapted to the MK. IV's ~200 MHz by using it as the intermediate frequency stage of a superheterodyne system. To do this, they had added another tube that stepped down the frequency from the radar's 193 MHz to 45 MHz. In theory this should be just as easily adapted to the AIS's 3 GHz, using a similar solution. The problem was that the magnetron's frequency tended to drift, in small amounts pulse-to-pulse, and much greater amounts as it heated and cooled. Any sort of fixed-frequency step-down like the one used in the Mk. IV wouldn't work. After trying a variety of designs based on klystrons and older-style magnetrons, they eventually gave up.

The solution was provided by well-known tube expert Robert W. Sutton at the Admiralty Signals Establishment. He designed a new tube for this purpose, today known as the Sutton tube but at that time more widely known as a reflex klystron. This was essentially a conventional two-cavity klystron with one cavity removed. The remaining cavity was fed a tiny amount of the output from the magnetron, causing the electrons passing by it to take up the pattern of the radio signal (this is the basis of all klystrons). Normally this would then pass the second resonator where the output would be tapped, but in the Sutton tube, the electrons instead approached a high-voltage plate that reflected them back towards their source. By carefully controlling the voltage of the reflector, the electrons would arrive having gained or lost a controlled amount of velocity, thus inducing a different frequency signal in the cavity as they passed it the second time. The combination of the original and new frequency produced a new signal that was sent to the conventional receiver. Sutton delivered an example producing 300 mW in October 1940.

One problem now remained, the need for two antennas for broadcast and reception. Lovell had attempted a solution using two dipoles in front of a common parabolic reflector, separated by a 5 inches (13 cm) metal disk, but found that enough signal leaked through to cause the crystal detectors in the receivers to burn out. On 30 December 1940 Dee noted that no solution had been found along these lines and that in spite of best efforts the crystals still lasted only a few hours. Another solution was suggested by Epsley of GEC, who used a tuned circuit of two spark gap tubes and dummy loads to switch off the receiver's input using the magnetron's own signal as the switching signal. This worked, but ¾ of the output signal was lost into the switch. In spite of this problem, the team decided to adopt it for the Blenheim in February 1941.

=== Flight testing ===
In January 1941 scanner units from both GEC and Nash & Thompson had arrived at Leeson for testing. The aircraft was still being fitted with the radome, so the team took the time to test both units head to head and see if one had a clear advantage in terms of interpreting the display. On the bench, watching the operation of the spiral scanner produced various results of awe in the team. Dee later wrote:

It must be confessed that when R.A.F. personnel at Christchurch saw the first A.I. scanner system installed in an aircraft, doubts were cast on the sanity of the scientists. Before the system reached a speed of rotation greater than the eye could follow, it could be watched rotating in a curiously irregular fashion with the one apparent desire of escaping from the aircraft altogether.

By March 1941 the first AIS unit was ready for flight testing. This was fitted to Blenheim N3522 under an early model radome with a wooden reinforcing band. Hodgkin and Edwards took it up for its first flight on 10 March, and after minor trouble with fuses, they were able to detect their target aircraft at about 5,000 to 7,000 foot (1.5–2.1 km) at about 2,500 foot (760 m) altitude, an altitude where the Mk. IV would have a range of only 2,500 feet. Using the Battle as a target, they soon reached 2 to 3 miles (3.2–4.8 km). Tests of the prototype continued through October with a continual parade of high-ranking civilians and military observers examining it.

At first the minimum range was over 1,000 feet (300 m) against an RAF requirement of 500 feet (150 m). Two members of the AIS team, Edwards and Downing, worked on this problem for over six months before reliably reducing this to around 200 to 500 feet (61–152 m). This represented a significant advance over AI Mk. IV, which was still around 800 feet or more. By this time the Air Ministry had decided to order the system into production in August 1941 as AIS Mk. I, later being renamed AI Mk. VII.

The team had originally predicted that the system would have a practical detection range on the order of 10 miles (16 km), but never managed to stretch this much beyond 3 miles. Much of this was due to the inefficient system being used to blank out the receiver during the transmission pulse, which wasted most of the radio energy. This final piece of the puzzle was provided by Arthur Cooke, who suggested using the Sutton tube filled with a dilute gas as a switch, replacing the spark gap system. During transmission, the power of the magnetron would cause the gas to ionise, presenting an almost perfect radio mirror that would prevent the signal from reaching the output. When the pulse ended the gas would rapidly de-ionise, allowing signals to flow across (or around) the cavity and reach the output. Skinner took up development of the concept with Ward and Starr, initially trying helium and hydrogen, but eventually settling on a tiny amount of water vapour and argon. The resulting design, known as a soft Sutton tube, went into production as the CV43 and the first examples arrived in the summer of 1941.

This testing also demonstrated two unexpected and ultimately very useful features of the spiral scan system. The first was that since the scanning pattern crossed the ground when the antenna was pointed down, the ground returns produced a series of curved stripes along the lower portion of the display. This formed an analogue of an artificial horizon, one that radar operators found extremely useful in combat because they could immediately see if the pilot was responding correctly to their commands. Various members of the team record having been surprised by this outcome, noting that the effect was obvious in retrospect and should have been predicted.

The other surprise was that ground returns caused a false signal that always appeared at the same range as the aircraft's current altitude, no matter where the dish was pointed. This was in much the same fashion as the Mk. IV, but in this case, the signal was much smaller whenever the dish was not pointed down. Instead of a wall of noise at the range of the aircraft's altitude, the signal caused a faint ring, leaving targets on either side visible. The ring was initially very wide, caused by returns not only directly under the aircraft but further away as well. After several months of work, Hodgkin and Edwards managed to provide a tuning control that muted down the weaker signals, leaving a sharp ring indicating the aircraft altitude. This too was a useful indicator for the operators, as they could see they were at the same altitude as their target when the ring overlapped the target blip.

Finally, the team noticed that the system would often create false echoes during heavy rainstorms, and the potential for using this as a weather system was immediately seen. However, they were sure that shorter wavelengths like those in the X band being experimented with would have a greater interaction, and this was not considered further at the time.

=== Further development ===
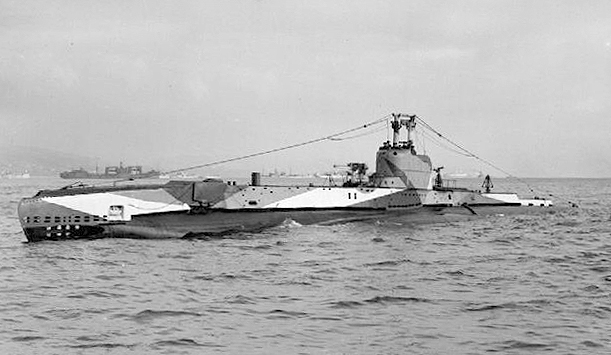
The successful detection of HMS Sea Lion by AIS spelt doom for the German U-boat fleet. By 1943, Coastal Command aircraft with centimetric ASV radars could hunt down submarines with even small portions above water.

Over the summer, the original experimental set was used in a series of experiments against submarines. The first took place on 30 April 1941 against HMS Sea Lion, and a second on 10–12 August against ORP Sokół. These clearly demonstrated that the AIS could indeed detect the submarines with only the conning tower exposed, just as the Admiralty had hoped. This led to orders for air-to-surface-vessel (ASV) radars based on the AIS electronics.

A second Blenheim, V6000, became available for additional testing. The team began to use this aircraft as a testbed for alternate scanning solutions, leaving the original N3522 with the spiral-scan system. One of the first tests was to use a manual scanning system in place of the spiral or helical systems, allowing the operator to scan the sky using controls on his receiver sets. Once a target was found, they could flip a switch and the system would track that target automatically from that point. After considerable effort, they decided this concept simply didn't work, and that the mechanical scanning systems were a better solution.

The team then began to compare the performance and ease-of-use of the helical vs. spiral scanners, with the GEC helical system being mounted in V6000. After extensive tests by George Edwards and O'Kane of GEC they had made no firm conclusions which system was better. Further work on these systems ended as the pressure to install the Mk. VII units, now improving in quantity, became pressing. This also seems to be the reason that US versions, known as the SCR-520, were largely ignored after having been developed with extreme speed over the winter. Bowen, who had returned from the US by this point, notes the confusion during the rush to install.

=== Mk. VII ===
With the return of better weather during the spring of 1941, the Luftwaffe began to ramp up their night bombing campaign, the Blitz. By this time a number of changes in the night fighter groups were poised to greatly improve the performance of the defence. Along with increasing numbers of Beaufighters with Mk. IV, the first ground controlled intercept radars were becoming available, which greatly improved the efficiency of arranging an interception. Losses to the night fighter forces continued to mount throughout the spring, roughly doubling every month until the Luftwaffe called off The Blitz at the end of May.

During this period the Germans noticed that aircraft dropping mines into ports and rivers almost always returned successfully. These aircraft flew at low altitudes throughout their missions, generally under 5,000 feet (1.5 km). They soon began to take advantage of this, selecting targets near the coast and flying the entire mission at low altitudes. The reason for their success was due primarily to the fact that the CH radar's lowest detection angle was about 1.5 degrees above the horizon, which meant aircraft could approach quite closely before being detected, leaving little or no time to arrange an interception. Watt was able to rapidly respond to this threat by taking over deliveries of a British Army radar originally developed to detect ships in the English Channel, mounting them on tall masts to provide a long horizon, and renaming them Chain Home Low (CHL). CHL was effective down to about 500 feet (150 m).

While CHL provided detection of a raid, the Mk. IV equipped night fighters were powerless to stop them. Under 5,000 feet (1,500 m) altitude the chance of seeing the target was basically zero. The AIS sets were perfectly suited to closing this gap, which led to a rush program to get them into service as rapidly as possible. A contract for 100 hand-built prototypes was ordered from GEC in May 1941 and given the name AI Mk. VII. (Note: The Mk. V and VI were further developed versions of the Mk. IV that did not enter service.) At the end of July, Sholto Douglas ordered four sets to be fitted with all speed to provide operational test units.

By this point Dee had begun efforts to mount the system to its intended platform, the Bristol Beaufighter. Hodgkin was put in charge of getting Bristol to provide an example with the radome fit, but he found that the engineer in charge of the workshop was reluctant to do so. High-level pressure from Dee and others followed, and X7579 was quickly adapted, arriving at Christchurch in September 1941. At the time the Mk. VII consisted of a large number of fairly large equipment boxes that were entirely unsuitable for production use, and Hodgkin expressed his surprise at how well the work progressed in spite of this. The aircraft was ready for testing on 2 October.

=== American competition ===
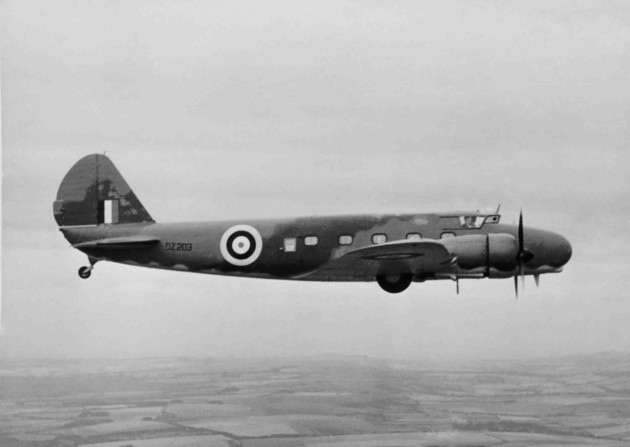
A formerly Canadian Boeing 247D, DZ203, was used extensively during the war to test US radar systems in the UK.

Bowen remained in the US after the Tizard mission, and had been instrumental in the creation of the MIT Radiation Laboratory, whose progress by November 1940 he described as "remarkable". Bowen began work with the RadLab on what became known as Project 1, the development of a magnetron-based AI radar similar to the prototype AIS. (Note: The Rad Lab started with three projects, AIS as Project 1, an anti-shipping system as Project 2, and a long-range navigation system as Project 3. Project 3 became LORAN.) Their first system, generally similar to the GEC helical-scan unit, was ready for testing in February 1941, and fitted to the nose of a Douglas B-18 Bolo bomber. It took flight for the first time on 10 March, the same day that the first AIS set flew in the UK. During this flight Bowen estimated the maximum range to be 10 miles, and on their return flight they flew past the naval yards at New London, Connecticut and detected a surfaced submarine at about 4 to 5 miles (6.4–8.0 km).

Having heard of this performance, Hugh Dowding, who was visiting the US at the time, pressed to see it for himself. On 29 April, after detecting a target aircraft at about 2 to 3 miles (3.2–4.8 km) Dowding once again asked Bowen about the minimum range, which they demonstrated to be about 500 feet (150 m). Dowding was impressed, and before leaving to return to the UK, met with his counterpart, James E. Chaney, telling him about the system's performance and pressing for its immediate development for purchase by the RAF.

Western Electric was given the contract to deliver five more units with all haste, under the name AI-10. (Note: Later AI radars used digits instead of roman numerals, AI.17 and AI.24 for example. The US radar would go into service as the Mk. X, or AI.10. It is not clear whether "AI-10" is simply another way to write "AI Mk. X", or if this was an entirely separate name applied before it entered service. None of the available sources clearly state this one way or the other.) One of these would be kept by Western Electric, another by Bell Telephone, one would replace the original lash-up in the B-18, another sent to the National Research Council (NRC) in Canada and the final one sent to the UK. Originally the UK copy was to be installed in either a Douglas A-20 Havoc or the RAF model known as the Boston, but neither of these aircraft were available. Instead, the Canadian NRC supplied a Boeing 247 airliner, and after a test fit, it was disassembled and shipped to the UK. It arrived at RAF Ford and was re-assembled as DZ203 on 14 August and widely tested, largely to everyone's satisfaction.

AI-10 was similar in performance to the AIS systems of the same vintage, but Bowen found no strong desire on the part of the RAF to buy the device. This has been attributed to a number of factors including overwork by the AMRE team fitting their own equipment, as well as not invented here syndrome. However, two technical issues appear to be the main reason. One was that the system did not display range directly, and had to be switched to a separate display mode that was described as basically useless. Moreover, the set was far too large to easily fit into a Beaufighter, having been designed for the much larger Havoc (P-70) or even larger Northrop P-61 Black Widow.

The US continued work on the AI-10, and put it into production as the SCR-520. The SCR-520-B, used in the P-70, weighed 600 pounds (270 kg) spread over six units, the largest of which was about a 1 yard (0.91 m) on a side. Efforts to develop a smaller version led to the slightly smaller SCR-720-A, and then to the definitive SCR-720, otherwise similar in performance to the 520 but much smaller and reduced to only 412 pounds (187 kg).

=== Mk. VII into service ===
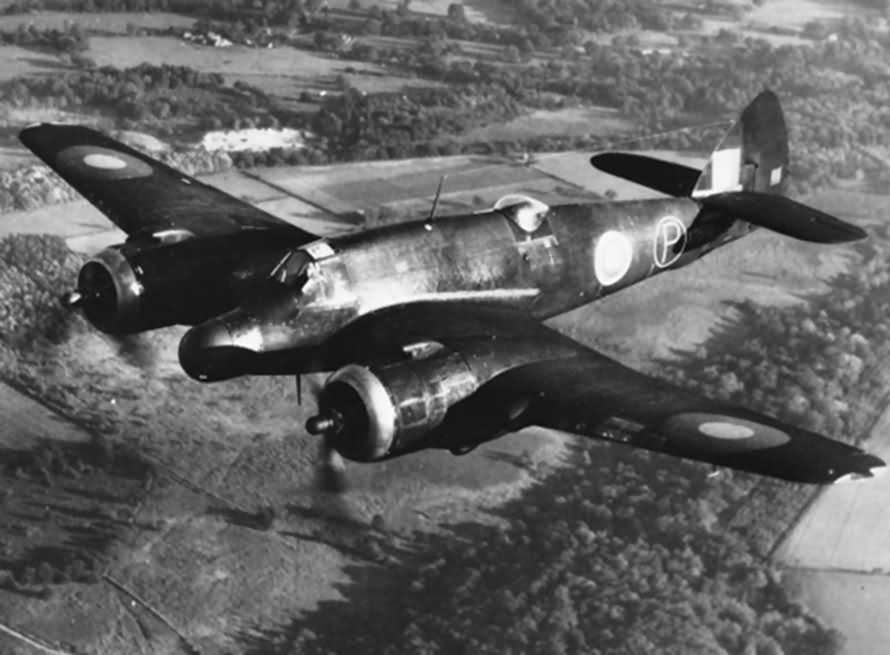
Beaufighter X7579 achieved the first success for the microwave radar system.

As Mk. VIIs arrived through October and November 1941, aircraft were fitted at Christchurch and then sent to the Fighter Interception Unit (FIU). The FIU was taking over the duties of a number of scattered experimental units and centralizing all test flight activities for Fighter Command. This process eventually reached SD flight and they moved to RAF Ford on 10 November, at which point Christchurch returned to being a satellite field for RAF Hurn.

The newly organised FIU flew X7579 with the prototype AIS for the first time on 30 November, with tests continuing until 14 December. During one test flight on 12 December, the operators came across a Junkers Ju 88 bomber on a mine-laying patrol over the Thames Estuary. The crew decided to press an attack, damaging the Ju 88 and causing oil from their target's engines to spray across their windscreen. They landed without problem, and celebrated the first success of AIS. The total for these prototype sets stood at seven destroyed and many damaged by 15 May.

Mk. VII's arrived in limited numbers over time. Even in experimental service, the sets proved to be excellent systems. A report compiled by the FIU noted that they gave considerably less trouble that earlier versions of Mk. IV at the same stage of development. They pressed for two squadrons to be completed as soon as possible.

FIU had its first success with a production Mk. VII on the night of 5/6 June 1942, when a Beaufighter caught a Dornier Do 217 over the Thames Estuary and shot it down. Generally, however, the introduction of the Mk. VII coincided with a decrease in Luftwaffe activity, but the systems continued to score the odd victories against low-flying aircraft. Eventually, Mk. VII's operating over the UK and in the Mediterranean would claim 100 victories, one for every set manufactured.

=== Mk. VIII ===
By the time the experimental Mk. VII units were beginning to arrive, the definitive Mk. VIII production version was being explored. One of the most pressing problems was the need to greatly reduce the size and complexity of the radar packaging, which almost completely filled the Beaufighter's rear section. Another issue was the desire to start using the new Sutton tubes for switching, which was expected to greatly increase the range of the system. Also desired was some way to use IFF and radio beacons with the AIS systems, as previous transponders had been deliberately designed to listen and respond on the original AI Mk. IV frequencies around 193 MHz.

The transponder problem had been growing before the introduction of AIS. IFF worked on the basis of a small receiver/transmitter set that listened for pulses from a radar and produced a low-power pulse broadcast on the same frequency but slightly delayed. The signal returned to the radar-equipped aircraft along with the original radar signal. When the two were amplified and displayed, the IFF signal caused the blip seen on the radar screen to stretch out. The original 1.5 m radar system had by this time been adapted to a wide range of roles including AI, ASV and acting as the basis for both the CHL and the new AMES Type 7 GCI radars. To avoid interference problems, each of these operated on slightly different frequencies, from about 180 to 210 MHz. The Navy and Army added their own variations. The IFF Mk. II, originally designed to respond to the Mk. IV, had to be repeatedly modified to respond to new radar frequencies, and none of the many models was able to respond to all of these.

The solution was to choose a single frequency for all of the IFF transponders to operate on, no matter what the radar system's natural frequency might be. The selected frequency was 180 MHz, a little under the lowest of the existing 1.5 m radars. The transponder radio was tuned only to this frequency, not the radar itself. The radar system also added a separate radio system for transmitting and receiving these pulses, the interrogator. When the radar operator pressed a button on their console, the interrogator began sending out pulses synchronised with those of the radar unit. The IFF unit in the target aircraft then responded with pulses with the same timing. The output of the interrogator's receiver was mixed with the radar's, causing the blip to extend as before. When this was added to the spiral scan display, instead of stretching the blip, the IFF signal appeared as a series of short line segments extending outward from the middle of the display, the sunrise pattern.

For unknown reasons, the team did not decide to use the same system for radio beacon use, as they had under Mk. IV. Instead, at meetings on the 13th and 14 July 1941, Hodgkin and Clegg decided to use the radar's own frequency for this role. This would require new transponders on the ground to support the AIS-equipped night fighters. The radar was adapted too, adding a switch that changed the pulse repetition frequency from 2,500 to 930 Hz, stretching the maximum range to 100 miles (160 km). (Note: It takes 1.073 milliseconds for light to travel 100 miles and back, 1000 ms / 1.073 ms is 931 Hz.) To offset the fact that fewer pulses were being sent, the pulse width was lengthened and two pulses were sent back-to-back, so the total radiated power did not change.

Additionally, during this period the magnetron team at Birmingham had made a breakthrough. One of the problems with the magnetron was that every pulse caused slightly different oscillations within each cavity, sometimes interfering with each other. With some patterns, particularly the pi mode, the signals added up and the tube was much more efficient. James Sayers had discovered that if a strap of metal was run between alternating lobes of the magnetron's cavities, the pi mode was strongly favoured. This allowed power levels to be greatly increased, and GEC began producing the new CV64, designed to operate at as much as 50 kW. These were known as strapped magnetrons.

Finally, by this time the UK electronics establishment had developed means to produce low-power pulses of extremely short duration, which were used to produce electronic scales on the same displays. As these scale lines were drawn using the same signals as the main radar pulses, they were always perfectly in synchronicity with the radar, offering accurate distance measurements without the need to calibrate an external mechanical scale. The system adopted for Mk. VIII drew circles every 2 miles (3.2 km) to a maximum of 8 miles (13 km). A new display mode was introduced for late stages of the interception, increasing the PRF and expanding the display to 2 miles (3.2 km), with the scale generating circles at 2,000 foot (610 m) intervals.

=== Production plan ===
With the success of AIS and Mk. VII, plans emerged to re-equip the entire night fighter force with Mk. VIII. A three-stage plan was put in place. In the first stage GEC would build 500 sets to the interim Mk. VIIIA standard, for delivery at the end of 1942. These would be able to be used with centimetric beacons designed for them, but did not include an IFF system. An order for 1,500 sets from a new production line was sent to EKCO, working in any changes as needed to address problems found during the Mk. VIIIA production and use, as well as IFF support. Finally, the last version would be the Mk. VIIIB, which included a wider variety of beacon modes and IFF, which would work into the production line as soon as these were ready. Unfortunately, as Hodgkin noted:

It turned out that there was considerable rivalry between EKCO and GEC and each firm was determined to engineer AI Mk. VIII in its own way, whereas the RAF rightly thought it essential to have identical sets of equipment. The reason why the two firms were involved was that senior people at the TRE, Dee, Skinner and Lewis, felt that GEC would always drag its feet because it hankered after its 20 cm project and that the only way to get things moving was to inject some competition into the system.

The first hand-built Mk. VIIIA arrived at Christchurch in March 1942, but does not appear to have been passed to the FIU. At this point the entire centimetric radar development became embroiled in new concerns about the increasing effectiveness of the Luftwaffe signals intelligence and night fighter defences. In June 1942 the first evidence that the Germans were jamming the 1.5 m radars was seen, and this led to calls for the AIS team to assist bringing the Mk. VIIIA into service as soon as possible, thereby once again delaying development of improved versions.

=== Another move ===
Malvern was even more imposing than Bawdsey, and was at last a suitable inland location.

In February 1942 the German battleships Scharnhorst and Gneisenau escaped from Brest, France in the Channel Dash, undetected until they were well into the English Channel. German ground forces had gradually increased the jamming of British radar over a period of weeks, and British operators had not realised this was happening. In the aftermath, Lord Mountbatten and Winston Churchill approved plans for a raid on the German radar station at Bruneval, near Le Havre. The Biting raid captured a German Wurzburg radar system and a radar operator.

During the weeks that followed, the British authorities became concerned that the Germans would retaliate in kind. When intelligence reported the arrival of a German paratroop battalion across the Channel, Rowe was given orders to move the unit with all haste. The task of finding a suitable site eventually fell to Spencer Freeman of the Emergency Service Organisation. Freeman began scouring lists of schools and partially completed hospitals by the Ministry of Works and Buildings, but none seemed suitable. While waiting out an air raid in Bristol, Freeman recalled someone having mentioned Malvern College. This had originally been set aside for the use of the Admiralty in case they were forced to leave London, but by this time the threat of invasion no longer seemed immediate and the site was no longer needed for their use.

When the team visited the school in April they found it empty, to their delight. However, this was only because the students were on Easter holidays and soon returned. H. Gaunt, the headmaster, was concerned about the mysterious arrival of numerous government inspectors on 25 April, who left without telling them anything. When he contacted the Ministry of Works and Planning he was informed that a government department would be moving into the school, forcing him to move the students for the second time in two years.

ADRDE, the Army group developing gun laying and truck-mounted early warning radars, moved to the site in May, and was renamed the Radar Research and Development Establishment (RRDE) in the process. They were soon joined by elements of the AMRE, who had also been renamed to become the Telecommunications Research Establishment (TRE). After arriving, the teams developed a plan to install the first six AI sets at nearby RAF Defford under the supervision of RAF fitters, at which point the aircraft would be flown to two operational fitting stations to serve as pattern aircraft for new sets as they arrived. This system ultimately proved very successful, with 80 aircraft a month being delivered at the peak.

=== Window ===
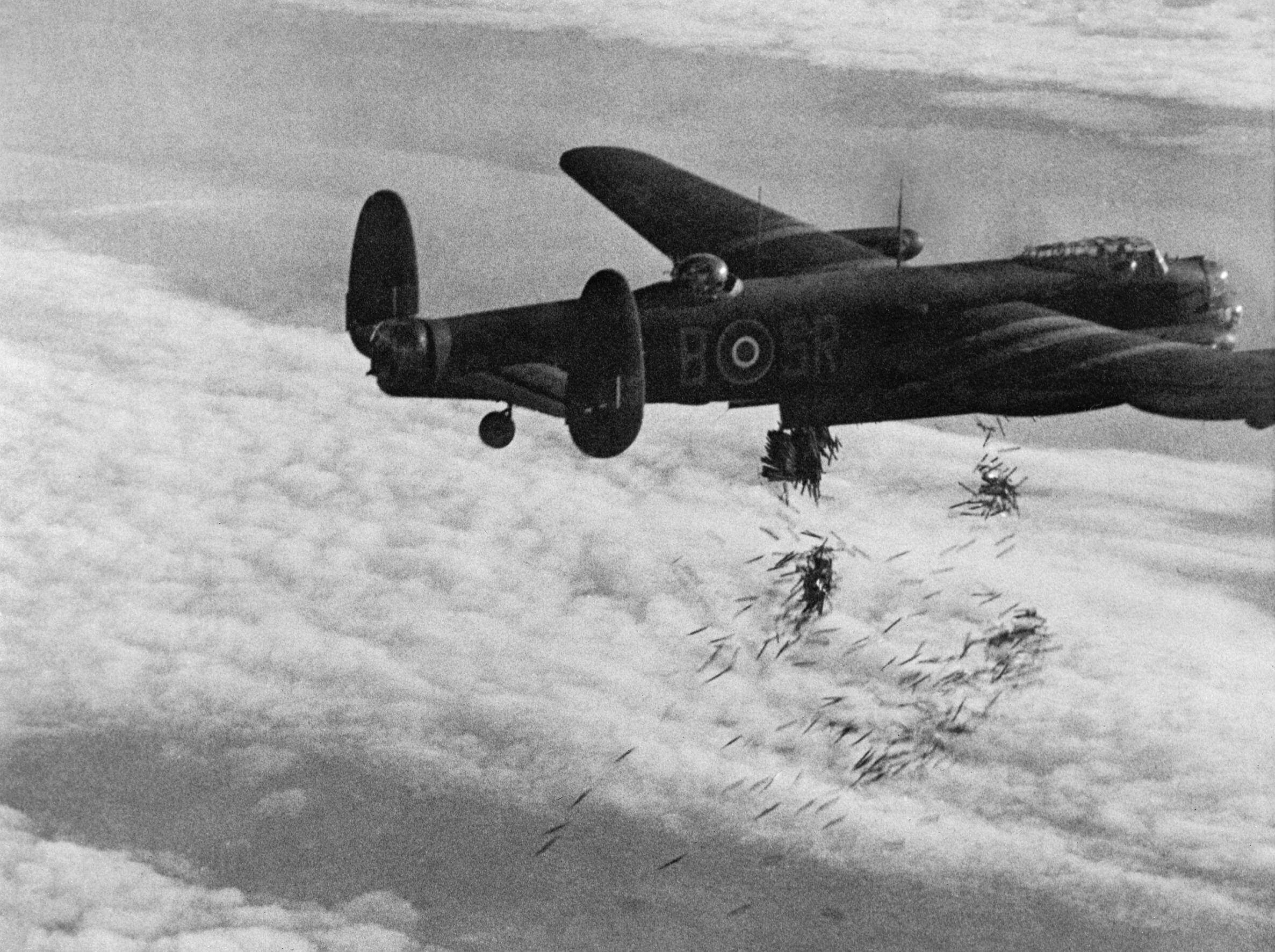
Bundles of window are dropped from an Avro Lancaster during a raid on Duisburg.

At the same time, a fight between Fighter Command and Bomber Command was brewing. Bomber Command was ramping up its campaign, but was suffering mounting losses at the hands of Josef Kammhuber's increasingly effective defences. They began pressing for permission to use chaff, known in the UK under the code-name window, which in testing had demonstrated its ability to blind radar systems. Air Chief Charles Frederick Algenon Porter ordered Bomber Command to begin using window on 4 April 1942, but he rescinded that command on 5 May under pressure from Sholto Douglas. Douglas pointed out that the Germans would be able to copy window the first time they saw it, and it was unwise to use it until its effect on the UK's own radars was better understood.

Under the direction of Frederick Lindemann, an extensive series of studies were carried out by Derek Jackson at RAF Coltishall. Starting in September, aircraft with Mk. IV and Mk. VII were tested against window in a series of 30 flights. Much to everyone's consternation, Jackson concluded that the Mk. VII's spiral-scan display proved to be affected by window more than the simpler display of the Mk. IV. When he learned the results, Douglas wrote a memo to the Air Ministry asking that window be held back until new radars could be developed that were not as susceptible to its effects.

One of the interesting coincidences of the war was that the Germans had already developed their own version of chaff under the code-name Düppel, and had tested it near Berlin and over the Baltic. However, Hermann Göring was worried that if they used Düppel over the UK, the RAF would quickly copy the concept and use it against them. As Bomber Command's fleet was rapidly growing, the results would likely be greatly in the RAF's favour. Learning from past mistakes when older material had leaked, Göring had most of the paperwork on Düppel destroyed.

== Operational service ==
=== Mk. VIIIA in service ===
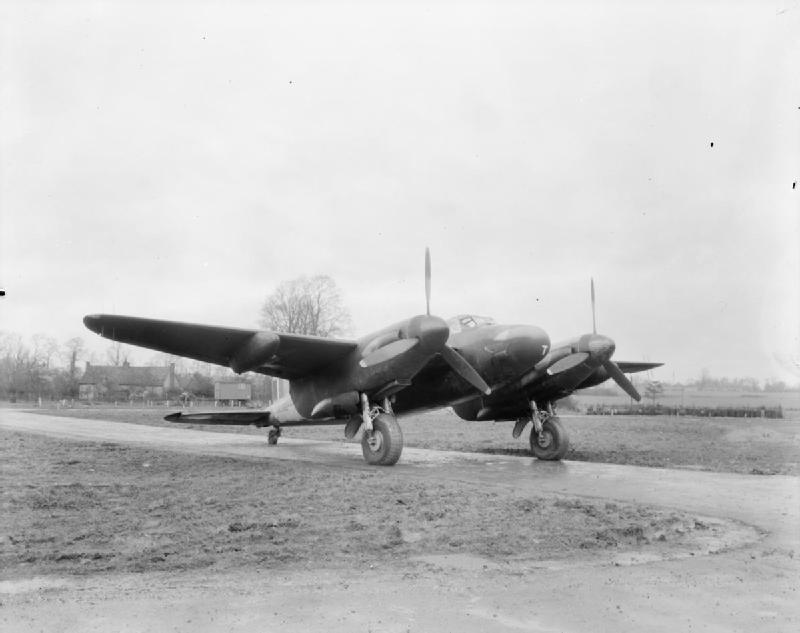
Installation in the De Havilland Mosquito, like this NF.XIII HK382 of No. 29 Sqn, used a thimble radome that required the removal of the four machine guns formerly in this location.

The first ten examples of the Mk. VIIIA from GEC's production line arrived in the first week of December 1942. These were rapidly installed and sent to operational squadrons, who operated them in low-altitude missions alongside aircraft with the Mk. IV which were sortied against high-altitude targets. The first success by the Mk. VIIIA was on the night of 20/21 January 1943, when an FIU aircraft caught a Do 217 over the Thames and shot it down in flames after a hard-fought, high maneuver fight.

Through this period, the Luftwaffe began strengthening their bomber units in France to begin raids in retaliation for the RAF's growing bombing campaign. A number of new aircraft, notably the K and M models of the Do 217 and A-14 model of the Ju 88 were provided to Luftflotte 3, who had about 60 of each type by the end of 1942. They carried out their first raid on the night of 17/18 January 1943, but this time met a force with new GL radars on the searchlights and a number of the new GCI radars guiding the night fighters. Five of the 118 aircraft taking part in the raid were shot down, three of them assisted by searchlights. Against this threat, the existing Beaufighter with AI Mk. IV proved adequate.

But in addition to bombers, Luftflotte 3 also organised a number of Focke-Wulf Fw 190s for bombing duty. These began to be used for daytime raids as fighter-bombers, or Jabos. After a few attempts with some losses, the Jabo force also turned to the night role. Even at its economical cruising speed, the aircraft would prove essentially impossible for the early Beaufighters to catch. A series of raids in April went unchallenged, and the biggest threat to the attacker was landing accidents or becoming lost and landing at RAF bases, which happened on several occasions. Although the Jabo force was capable of causing little damage, the RAF responded by rapidly introducing new aircraft like the Beaufighter VI, and equipping them with the new radars as quickly as possible. However, these aircraft had little speed advantage over the FWs, and were inadequate to the task.

A more convincing solution to the Jabo problem was just arriving. As early as July 1942, Mosquito Mk. II DD715 had been modified for night fighter use through the fitting of a newly designed thimble nose and the Mk. VIIIA radar. This required the removal of the four Browning machine guns that formerly occupied the nose area, leaving only the Hispano 20mm cannons in the belly. After trials, 97 more Mk. IIs were converted in this fashion starting in September 1942. A purpose-built night-fighter version of the Mosquito FB.VI, the NF.XII, began to arrive off the lines in February 1943. When the German fighters returned on the night of 16/17 May, No. 85 Squadron was positioned to intercept them and shot down five of the Jabos. Operations against the Jabos over the following months were equally successful, and the Jabo campaign wound down.

=== Mk. VIII in service ===
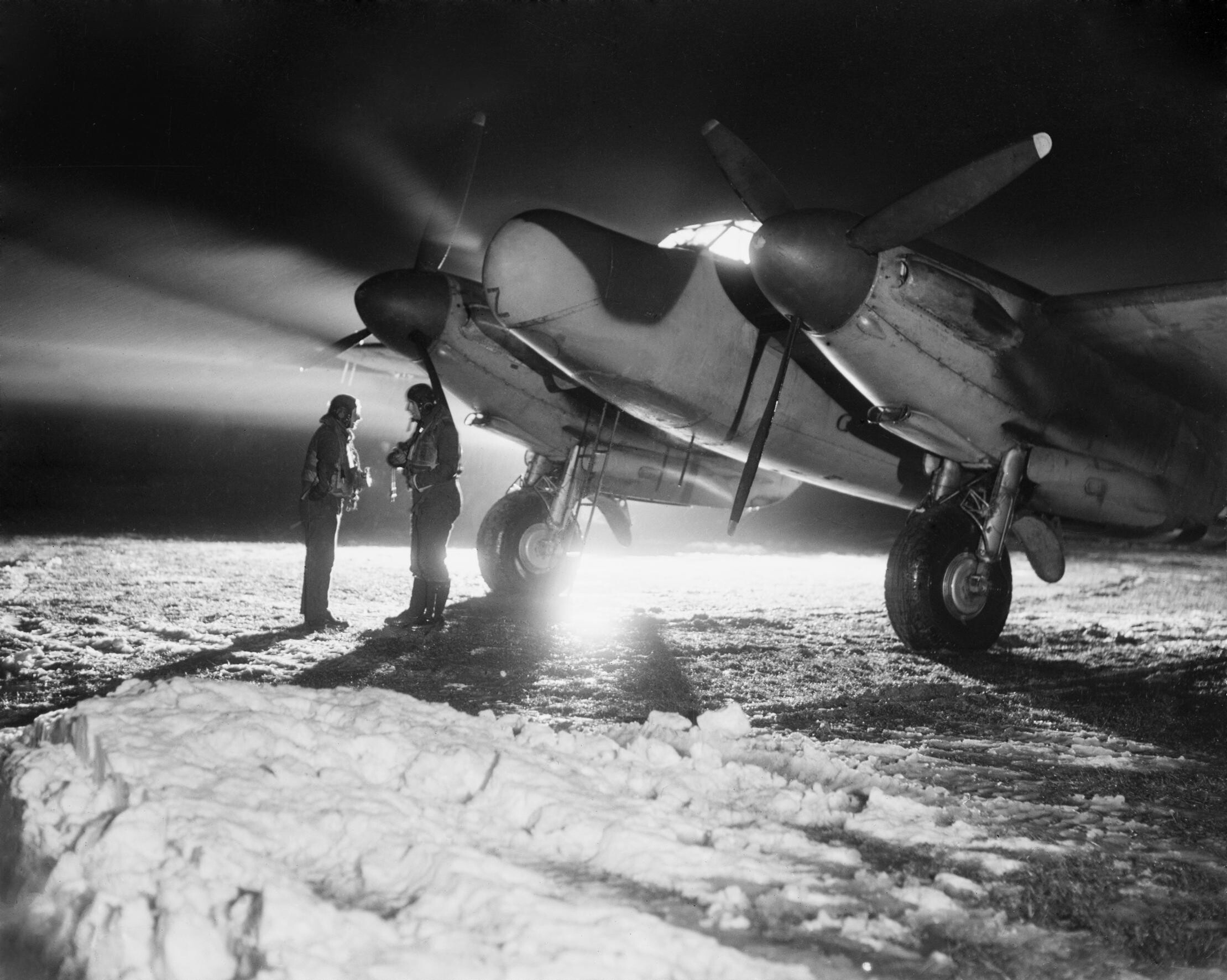
The distinctive thimble radome is particularly well displayed in this image of a Mosquito NF.XII in the snow at B51/Lille-Vendeville, France.

The first pre-production Mk. VIII arrived on 21 December 1942 and was fit to a Beaufighter, revealing the need for a number of modifications. In spite of using a magnetron that was ten times as powerful as earlier models, normal detection ranges remained short, about 4 miles (6.4 km). Modified versions began to arrive in numbers starting in May. As the production ramped up, these sets were sent preferentially to Mosquitoes, whose numbers built up significantly during the late summer. By this time the Jabo raids against large targets had wound down, while the Luftwaffe began their largest mine-laying campaign of the war. Through September and October, 37 Luftwaffe aircraft were destroyed on mine laying missions.

This period of the war was characterised by the ever-increasing size and power of Bomber Command's raids on Germany, and the Luftwaffe's subsequent attempts to defend against these devastating raids. The Luftwaffe's raids on the UK dropped considerably, with the exception of the mining efforts. This gave the RAF night fighter groups time to rest and re-equip, replacing their older Beaufighters and Mosquitos with new aircraft, mostly the new Mosquito NF.XII with Mk. VIII. This left the question of what to do with the Mk. IV equipped aircraft, many of which found a new life as intruders using the new Serrate radar detectors.

=== Operation Steinbock ===
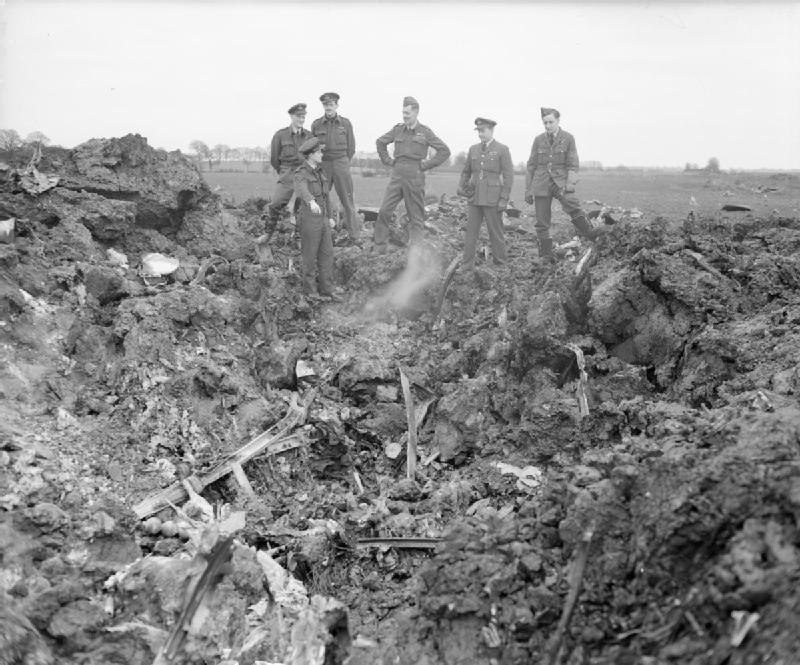
This crater and debris are all that remains of a Ju 188E-1 shot down by a Mk. VIII-equipped Mosquito NF.XII of 488 Sqn RNZAF on the night of 21 March 1944, near the height of the Steinbock raids.

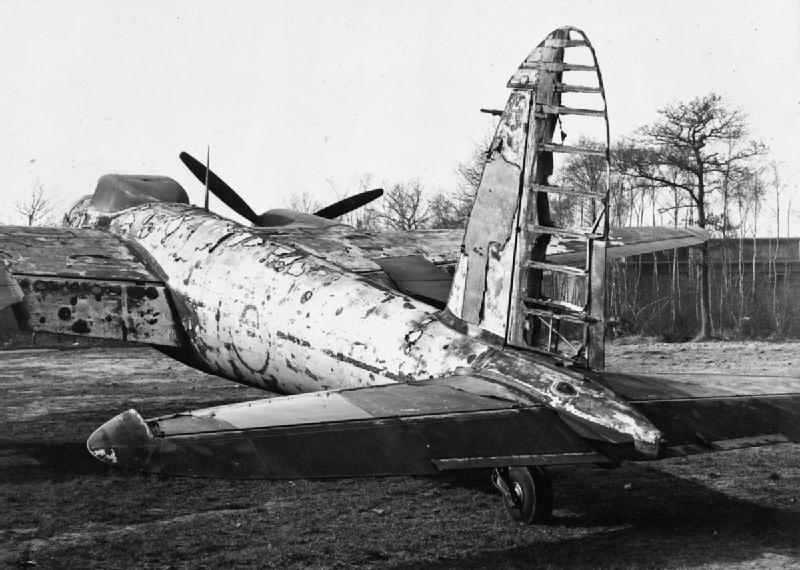
This Mosquito NF.XVII of 85 Sqn was covered by the burning oil and debris of a Junkers Ju 188 they shot down on the night of 23/24 March.

The Luftwaffe attempted one last strategic bombing campaign against the UK in early 1944: Operation Steinbock. Luftflotte 3 assembled a fleet of 474 bombers, including the newer Junkers Ju 188s and Heinkel He 177 as well as additional numbers of the Messerschmitt Me 410 heavy fighter in the jabo role. They would use Düppel, their version of window, for the first time in a large-scale attack. Additionally, some aircraft had the Truhe navigation system, a copy of the UK Gee, as well as their own Y-Gerät although it was known this could be jammed.

By this time the RAF had reorganised itself in preparation for Operation Overlord, and had moved many of its fighter aircraft to the 2nd Tactical Air Force. Those aircraft suitable for defence were reorganised into the re-created Air Defence of Great Britain (ADGB) organisation. ADGB was equipped almost entirely with the Mosquito NF.XII, XIII and XVII, equipped with Mk. VIII and some Mk. X (see below) radars. However, many of these aircraft were assigned to other duties, some units were refitting, and in all perhaps 65 night fighters were available for service.

Originally planned for December, a variety of problems delayed the first Steinbock raid until the night of 21/22 January 1944. Using every trick the RAF had developed, Luftwaffe pathfinders dropped white marker flares along the route and marked London in green. Throughout the raid the attackers dropped large quantities of Düppel, which successfully jammed the 1.5 m band radars. A number of newer centimetric sets had recently been deployed, and these were able to continue guiding the fighters to the best of their abilities given operator overload. Mosquitos of ADGB claimed 16 bombers destroyed or probable, while the new centimetric guided anti-aircraft artillery added another 9. A further 18 German aircraft never returned, having become lost or crashing while landing. This represented about 10% of the attacking force of 447 bombers. This sort of loss exchange ratio was greater than the Luftwaffe typically managed to achieve against the RAF, and great enough that continued missions with these sorts of losses would quickly deplete the force. For all of this effort, the bombers dropped a total of only 30 tons on the city, causing 14 killed and 74 injured, a tiny fraction of the nightly load during The Blitz. Hitler was apoplectic.

The US opening of Battle of Anzio the next day immediately stripped Luftflotte 3 of 100 of their bombers, which were sent to Italy. Steinbock attacks continued through February with similarly bad results; by the end of the month the Mosquitoes had claimed 28 aircraft. Large attacks continued sporadically through March, including the night of 19/20 March when Joe Singleton and Geoff Haslam of No. 25 Sqn shot down three Ju 88's in a 13-minute span. Such events were not uncommon, and a number of crews racked up multi-kill missions. Smaller raids continued through the end of April with some harassment raids in May, by which point Luftflotte 3's force had fallen from 695 (Note: Including bombers as well as other aircraft.) to just 133 operational aircraft. In comparison, RAF losses were about two dozen, with only one of those to enemy action.

=== In action against the V-1 ===
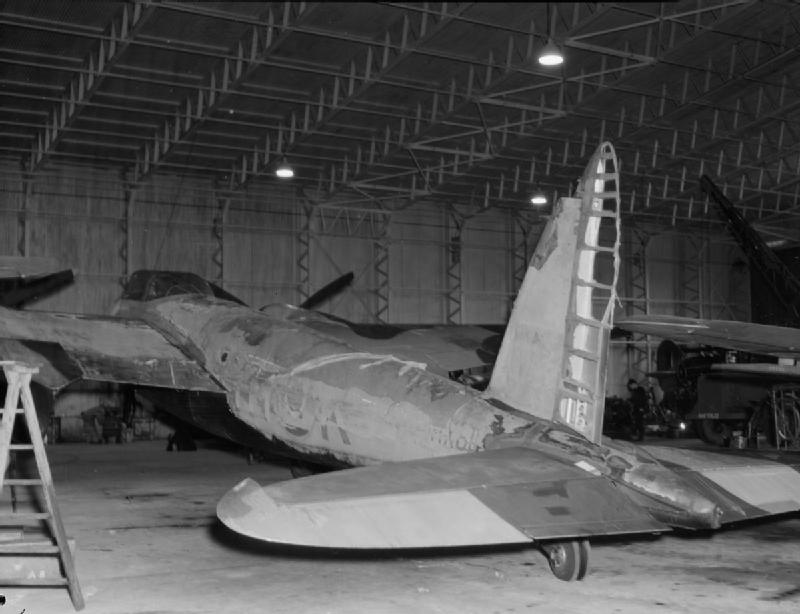
Shooting down a V-1 was dangerous, as this Mosquito FB.VI of 418 Sqn RCAF demonstrates with its burned-off outer fabric.

The V-1 flying bomb was first launched against London on 13 June, and soon grew to a threat much larger than the Luftwaffe's bombers. A defensive system was quickly arranged and went into operation on 15 June, but the overlapping operational areas of the anti-aircraft guns and fighters proved to be confusing to all involved. After talking to Frederick Alfred Pile, General of the Army's AA units, Air Marshal Roderic Hill re-arranged the AA guns in a thin belt along the coast, with the fighters operating inland. This greatly improved the operations by both forces.

V-1 launches took place day and night, cruising at about 350 mph (560 km/h), the upper limit of many of the defensive fighters. Mosquito pilots soon took up the trick of flying over the Channel looking for the flames of the V-1 engine being ignited. When they saw one that would pass by their location, they would fly into a position above and to one side of the missile, and then dive on it from the side to keep the flames in sight through the approach. This diving approach allowed them to overtake the missile. The problem was knowing when to open fire, as it was difficult to tell range at night when only the flames were visible. Range was called out continually by the radar operator during the approach, with the pilot opening fire when they reached 1,000 to 900 feet (300–270 m). The whole operation was dangerous, as radar operator Jimmy Rawnsley recalled during one Mosquito flight:

I looked up as the guns crashed briefly; and I immediately ducked down again. The bomb had burst just 300 yards ahead of us, and we were rushing at over 150 yards a second straight at the heart of the explosion. For a few seconds the jet of air from the ventilator close to my head blew hot and acrid; but we were still flying. Sitting up and looking back, I saw that the air behind us was full of glowing red fragments still fanning out and floating downward.

Ultimately a total of 8,081 V-1s were fired at the UK from 13 June to 1 September. Of these, 1,902 were destroyed by fighters and another 1,564 by anti-aircraft fire, leaving 2,340 to reach London.

After this time the launching sites had been overrun, and V-1 operations moved to airborne launch from He 111 bombers. Through July and August, KG 3 launched a total of just under 400 V-1s, initially during the day but quickly switching to night actions. KG 3's third Gruppe was redesignated as the re-formed I.Gruppe/KG 53 in September, continuing the campaign while repeatedly pulling back toward Germany in the face of the Allied advances. The firings eventually ended on 14 January 1945, by which point 1,012 missiles had been fired for the loss of 77 He 111's and 404 of the missiles destroyed in flight.

== Further development ==
=== Lock-follow ===
Although the precise origins of the concept are unknown, on 8 March 1941 Bernard Lovell recorded the concept of lock-follow in his notes for the first time. This was a modification to the spiral-scan system that allowed it to track targets automatically without further manual operation. Radars including lock-follow became known as AIF or AISF. (Note: The meaning of the F in AIF is not found in existing references, but likely stands for Follow.)

Lovell had earlier built a ground-based system for the Navy with a wide beam pattern for detecting ships and adapted this for an automatic aircraft tracking system at Leeson. He was joined by engineers from several companies, along with "Freddie" Williams. (Note: Hodgkin appears to suggest that it was Williams that led the primary development effort.) Williams applied some of the techniques he had used on a differential analyser to produce a system known as the Velodyne that tracked smoothly in spite of hard manoeuvring and large crossing speeds by the target. The unit also sent ranging information directly to the gyro gunsight, pre-setting it so it could be fired as soon as the target was spotted.

The system worked by having two dipole antennas instead of one, slightly offset on either side of the mounting mast projecting through the middle of the parabolic dish. Being offset, the beams produced by the two dipoles were angled away from each other, to either side of the dish centreline. Normally the signals from both were added together and displayed, producing an output largely identical to the single-dipole case. The dipole shaft was mounted on another motor that rapidly spun them at 800 rpm. A switch was placed so that it was triggered by the motor when the dipoles were roughly vertical or roughly horizontal, triggering a second circuit that subtracted the signals from each other instead of adding. The result was the difference in signal strength, which indicated which of the two dipoles was receiving more energy at that instant. This signal was fed into the scanner motors, driving it in the right direction.

Interceptions using the system started just like the normal AIS, with the operator seeking targets as the system moved in its spiral scan. When a target was selected, the radar operator turned another knob to adjust the strobe, a time-base circuit that produced a ring on the display. When the strobe lay over a target's return a button was pushed, causing the signals before or after that range to be filtered out (known as gating), leaving only the selected target visible on the screen. The tracking circuits would then ensure the radar dish remained pointing at the target as it moved.

The system was basically functional by the autumn of 1941, using the electronics from the Mk. VII and a new 50 kW magnetron to produce the AI Mk. IX. This offered initial detection at ten miles, lock-on at five, and was able to track relative movements of up to 10 degrees per second, as well as angular accelerations of 10 deg/s^{2}. In spite of this promising development, on 1 January 1942 Lovell was sent to work on the H2S system. The Mk. IX was then put under the direction of Arthur Ernest Downing, with the team still predicting it would be available in 1942.

=== Mk. IX ===
At November 1942 meeting of the Air Interception Committee, the future of AI radar was discussed with an eye to producing a plan for the long-term evolution of the systems. Among many ideas considered, the team chose a number of features they wished to see. Primary was the idea of an all-round view more like the ground-controlled intercept radars, which would allow the fighters to plan their own interceptions with less ground control required. Range was to be extended to at least 10 miles (16 km), with a reduced minimum range of 200 feet (61 m). The short minimum range was selected, along with demands for 1/2 degree accuracy dead-ahead, to allow blind firing without visual contact. Other features like lock-follow and accurate range finding were also considered.

Three designs incorporating some of these features were studied. One was essentially an X band adaptation of the otherwise unmodified Mk. VIII, operating at 3 cm instead of 10 cm. The second was a Mk. VIII that adopted the spiral-scan technique instead of helical. The third was the AIF system being developed by Lovell. After some discussion, the X band concept was dropped; they concluded that RAF familiarity with S band equipment, along with the ability to use existing beacons, outweighed any technical advantages.

When the great debate about window broke out in the spring of 1942, Downing suggested that the AIF might be naturally immune to its effects. Window, which consists of lightweight aluminum foil and paper, stops in the air almost immediately after being dropped and then falls slowly to the ground. An AIF locked onto a bomber would see these signals quickly pass out of the gated range, and they would disappear. To test this theory, a Beaufighter was flown to Coltishall and fitted with the AIF prototype. Jackson carried out 13 flights in November to test the system against window. These tests demonstrated, to great concern, that the system would instead lock onto the window and break contact with the bomber.

Downing suggested a number of changes to better hold a lock in the presence of window, and made these changes over the next weeks. On 23 December 1942 the upgraded Mk. IX was being personally operated by Downing in a Beaufighter while a second Beaufighter with Jackson on board as an observer was dropping window. Jackson recalls overhearing radio messages from ground operators sending Spitfires to investigate two bogies, and worrying that they might be referring to their aircraft. Soon after, two Spitfires appeared out of the clouds and opened fire on both Beaufighters. Jackson's damaged aircraft made it back to Coltishall, but Downing's aircraft crashed into the sea, killing all aboard.

=== Mk. X ===
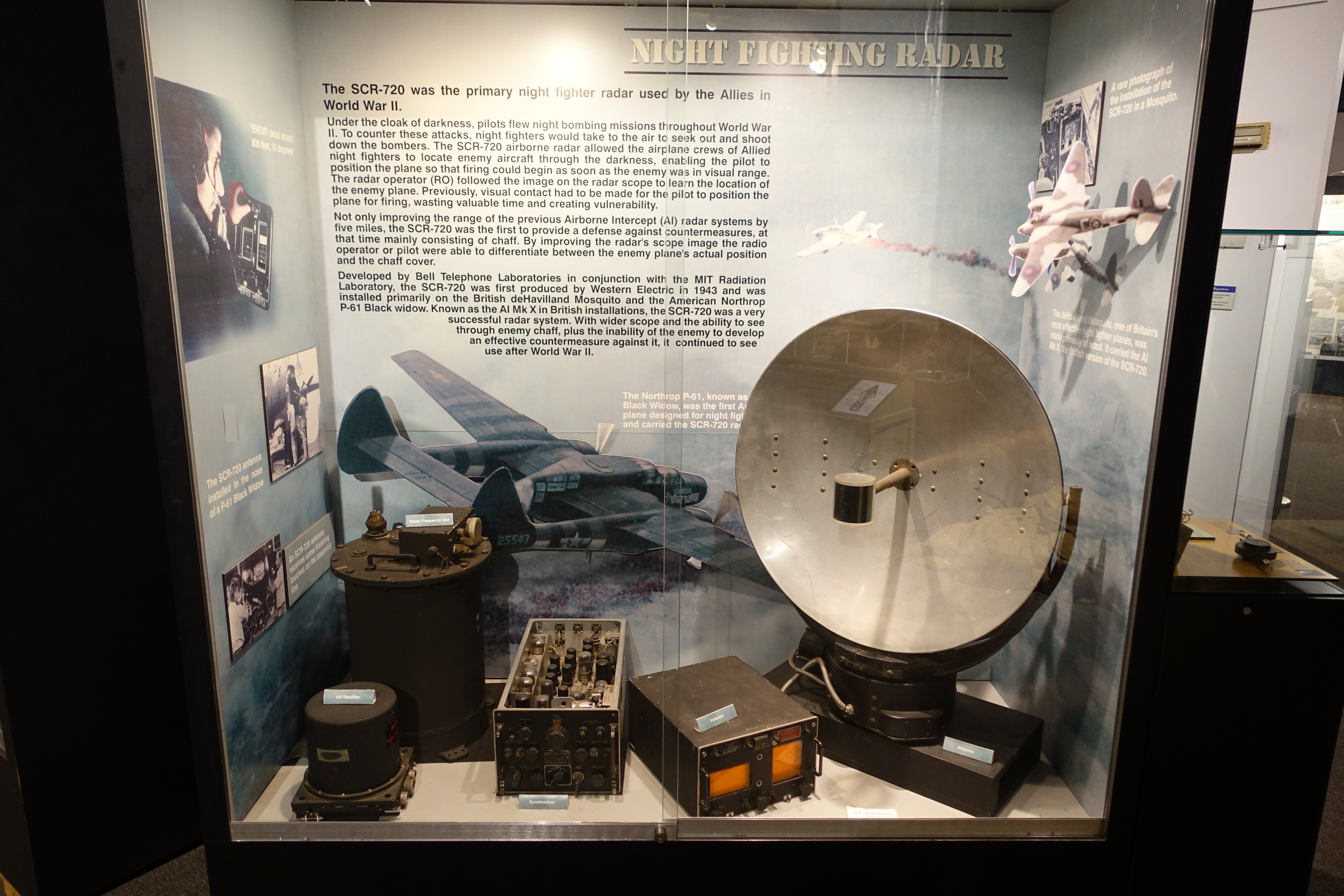
The SCR-720, known as AI Mk. X in RAF service, was a relatively compact system, especially compared to the earlier SCR-520.

The loss of the only Mk. IX prototype, along with its primary developer, seriously delayed the program. At about the same time the TRE had taken delivery of an SCR-720 unit from the US. This was a re-packaged and lightened version of the SCR-520, suitable for use in the Beaufighter and Mosquito. The first example arrived from Western Electric in December 1942, and testing against window was carried out by Jackson in January 1943. Jackson found that through judicious switching of the range control he could set the radar so it was looking at the bomber, and the window would quickly pass out of range and disappear.

TRE made a number of minor suggestions and upgrades, and placed an order for 2,900 of these SCR-720B's under the name AI Mk. X. However, Western Electric had been concentrating on the SCR-520 for mounting in the Northrop P-61 Black Widow, the American 15-ton flight weight, 66 ft wingspan purpose-designed twin-engined night fighter large enough to carry it. By this time the P-61 was greatly delayed and the USAAF had begun using Beaufighters and Mosquitoes for their own needs. This led to demands by both the USAAF and RAF for the SCR-720 production to move up, and Western Electric responded by stating initial units would be available in May 1943, with production quantities available in August.

With the decision made, the Air Ministry finally allowed window to be used in July 1943. It was used for the first time on a raid on Hamburg on the night of 24/25 July 1943. The effects were spectacular; having become accustomed to using radar to guide their defences, window produced so many false targets that the operators had no idea what to do. AA guns were seen to fire randomly into the sky while night fighters flew in circles. The attacking force lost only 12 aircraft, 1.5% of the force, about what would be expected from entirely random events.

The first SCR-720 was delivered on 12 July for fitting to Mosquito HK195, which was turned over to the FUI on 11 August and flew for the first time two days later. Small batches were completed on various marks of Mosquitos before the production was turned over entirely for installation on the NF.XIX, which featured Rolls-Royce Merlin 25 engines and a strengthened wing allowing them to carry external fuel tanks. Unfortunately, deliveries of the Mk. X proved to be greatly delayed, with the first 40 arriving in late autumn and found to be lacking many of the requested upgrades. Once these were finally adapted, they were found to interfere with the radio sets in the aircraft, (Note: A similar problem affected the earlier Mk. IV.) and it was not until January 1944 that the first Mk. X sets were sent to squadron use.

=== Further Mk. IX development ===
With the Mk. X selected for deployment, the Mk. IX program was greatly reduced in priority, and additional concepts were considered. In particular, the concept of adapting the Mk. IX to work in the S-band at 3 cm wavelengths was given long consideration, as this would provide even higher accuracy from the same antenna systems, or similar accuracy from smaller ones. EKCO began adapting the Mk. VIII equipment to be able to work at either 9 or 3 cm, although at that time the 3 cm magnetrons were capable of delivering only 50 watts of power and this option never utilized.

In a 23 September 1943 memo, Air Commander W. C. Cooper outlined four possible lines of development:

- AI Mk. IX – the version currently under development, combined with a pilot's indicator CRT
- AI Mk. IXB – IX with the pilot's indicator projected on the windscreen
- AI Mk. IXC – IXB with the pilot's indication combined with a gyro gunsight
- AI Mk. IXD – IXC with an analogue computer to calculate lead

Burcham took up development of the Mk. IX line in 1943, generally following the IXB concept. This was eventually mated with a new 200 kW magnetron. An early version of the set without the pilot's indicator was sent for testing to the FIU in Mosquito HK946 in December 1943, and returned some time later with an extensive list of upgrade suggestions.

The idea of windscreen projection had been attempted with the AI Mk. IV as the Mk. V, but a number of problems had been found and it was not adopted for service. Several updated versions were used in trials, but by 1943 the Mk. V radar was obsolete, and the Pilot's Indicator Display (PID) was instead adapted to the Mk. VIII. This time the system's output was not a separate CRT, but instead projected into the existing GGS Mk. II gyro gunsight. The system was fit to Mosquito HK419 some time in late 1943, and sent to the FIU for testing in January 1944. It received widespread praise.

With the Mk. X being installed for immediate use, all work to the PID was moved to the Mk. IX. The first Mk. IXB with PID was fit to Mosquito HK311 during 1944, and sent to the newly named Central Fighter Establishment (CFE, formerly FIU) on 22 December 1944. This set also included the various upgrades suggested by tests of the earlier Mk. IX. This aircraft was joined by an upgraded HK946, which underwent extensive testing between December 1944 and April 1945. The FIU found that the lock-follow system did not work at low altitudes, about 2,000 feet (610 m) over water or 5,000 feet (1,500 m) over land, but above these altitudes they found the Mk. IX to be superior to the Mk. X. They did point out that the system would require more training than the more natural display of the Mk. X, and that the display had to be adapted further so the PID did not obscure the cockpit instruments. The aircraft once again returned to Defford with a host of suggested improvements.

=== Post-war developments ===
With the ending of the war, development of the Mk. IX was put on hold. It was widely assumed that another war was another decade away, at a minimum.

In 1947, the Soviet Union began introducing its Tupolev Tu-4 bomber, able to reach the UK from bases in north-western Russia. In 1949, the Soviets tested their first atomic bomb. This led to an effort to greatly enhance the UK's radar systems under the ROTOR program, as well as introduce a new night fighter that was able to work well against the 350 miles per hour (560 km/h) speeds of the Tu-4. Although some work had already started on a jet-powered night fighter design, significant time and money could be saved by introducing a new version of the Mosquito with the appropriate upgrades.

During February 1948, the CFE was asked to evaluate the new Mosquito NF.38 equipped with the Mk. IXB for this role. They found that the problems using the lock-follow system at low altitudes remained, which left the Mk. X easier to use in these missions. They also noted that the Mk. IX still had problems achieving a lock in the presence of window, and that the PID was too dim to be used in daylight, while being too bright at night. They concluded:

The opinion of this Establishment is that AI Mk.9B is operationally unacceptable in freelancing, broadcast control, or bomber support operations. It is, therefore, recommended that AI Mk.9B should not be accepted for service use.

The CFE also rejected the NF.38, noting its performance was only slightly superior to that of the late-war NF.36, and barely superior to the performance of the B-29/Tu-4. As a night fighter sent against the Tu-4, it was expected to be essentially useless. Mk. IX was formally cancelled in 1949. One Gloster Meteor, VW413, was already being converted for Mk. IX tests, and was allowed to continue construction for testing during July 1950.

=== Naval use ===
Years later, Lovell learned that an adaptation of the Mk. IX system had also been tested aboard Motor Gun Boats in 1942 and it had been found that they would successfully track other boats and allow blind-fire of a 2-pounder with reasonable accuracy.

== Description ==
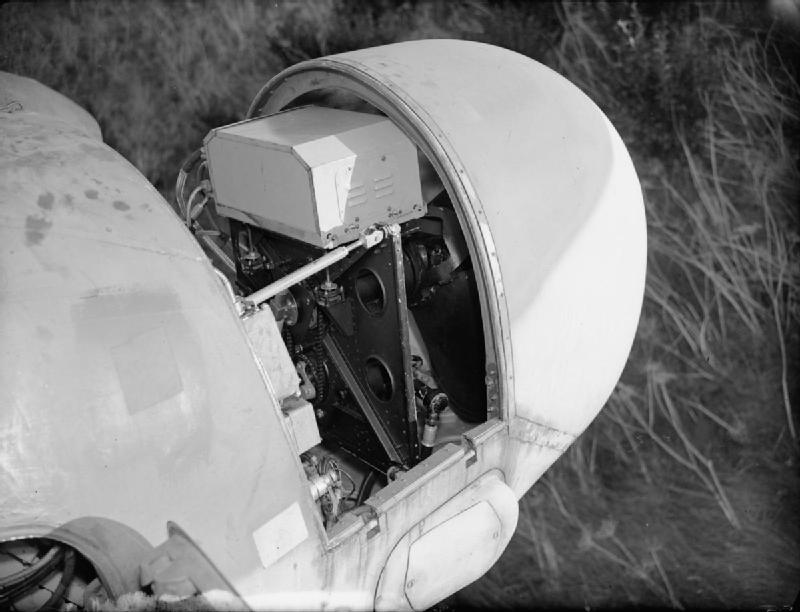
The Mk. VIIIB as mounted to a framework on the nose of the Mosquito. The electronics were contained in the white box, easily accessible under a removable fuselage panel. The radar dish scanner is mounted on the X-shaped frame.

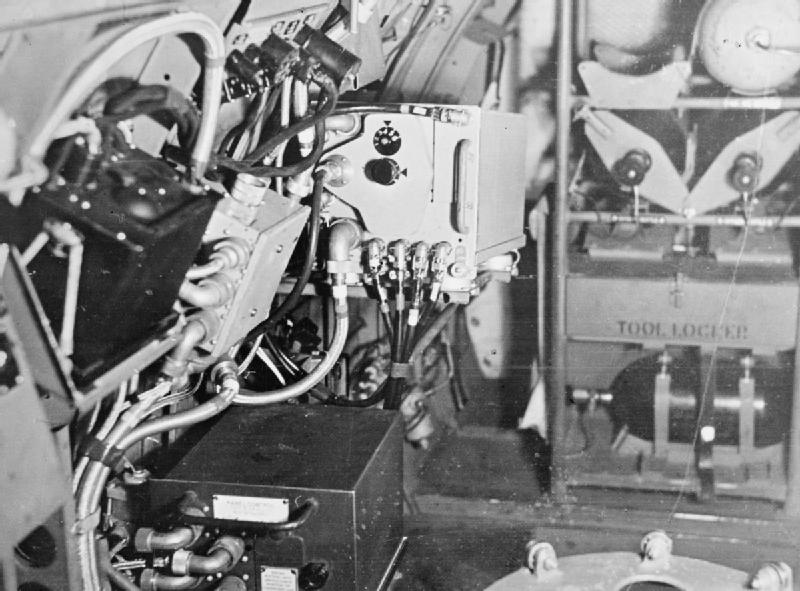
The Mk. VIIIA display was a complex but compact system, shown here installed on the starboard side of a Beaufighter.

The earlier Mk. VII radars were generally similar to Mk. VIII, but used a less powerful CV38 magnetron offering average power around 5 kW instead of 25 kW in the Mk. VIII's CV64. This reduced the normal operational range to about 3 miles (4.8 km), but the other performance measures were otherwise identical. Mk. VII lacked the alternate signal inputs needed to operate with IFF, beacons or AIBA, as described below. The rest of this description is based solely on the Mk. VIII.

=== Equipment layout ===
The Mk. VIII system consisted of two groupings of systems, the transmitter and antenna system mounted on the nose of the aircraft, and the majority of the receiver and the display systems mounted inside.

The nose-mounted equipment included the magnetron transmitter and the soft Sutton tube switch. These were combined in a single box mounted on the mounting frame, near the top of the frame on the Mosquito and the bottom on the Beaufighter, where they could be easily accessed. The scanner system was centred on the frame, rotating the 28 inches (71 cm) parabolic reflector (dish) through a complete circle 17 times a second. The signal was transmitted from a small vertically oriented half-wave dipole antenna and reflector mounted at the end of a post passing through a hole in the middle of the dish. A coaxial cable carried the signal from the magnetron to the back of the post. Among the parts on the frame were the Type 53 Modulator, which provided pulses of 35 Amps and 10 kV, the Type TR.3151 transmitter, containing the CV64 magnetron, CV43 soft Sutton switch and a crystal mixer, and the Type 50 receiver with its CV67 Sutton tube local oscillator that stepped down the frequency.

This left the receiver, time base system and the display inside the aircraft cabin. There was ample room for this in the Beaufighter where the radar operator sat at the back of the fuselage. In the Mosquito, the radar operator sat to the right and slightly behind the pilot. The main entry door was located on the right side of the fuselage, just in front of the radar operator. With the radar installed, this left almost no room to reach the door, so the time base circuitry was mounted on rails that allowed it to be slid up and forward, out of the way of the door. Among the parts inside the aircraft were the Type 73 display and the TR.3152 Lucero.

The system was provided power by the Type 225 power supply, running off a power take off shaft on one of the engines. This produced 1,200 W of 80 V AC power, converted to 500 W of DC power for those instruments that needed DC. The scanner motor was hydraulic, powered by a pump on one of the engines. The entire system, including the power supply and all the main equipment, weighed 212 pounds (96 kg).

=== Displays and interpretation ===
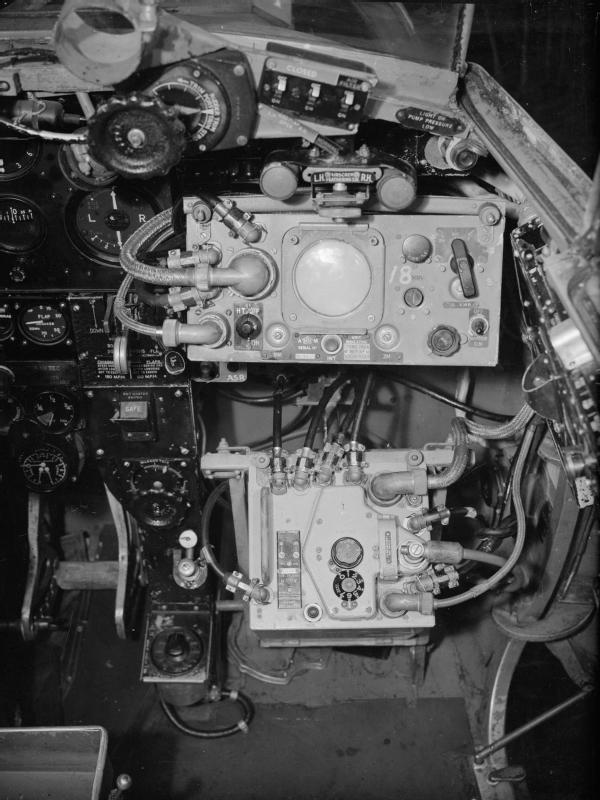
The Mk. VIIIB indicator and receiver was mounted in the nose of the Mosquito, shown here in a NF.XIII. The aircraft's small exit door can be seen in the lower right.

The Mk. VIII display consisted of a single CRT with a timebase calibrated to run from the centre of the display to its outer edge in the time it took for the radio signal to travel out and back to 10 miles (16 km). Sensors on the radar dish's scanner system fed signals to the electronics in the display that rotated the timebase to the same angle. If the scanner were turned off and the brightness (gain) control of the display turned all the way up, the time base would cause a line to appear on the display at the angle the dish was currently pointed.

When the scanner was turned on it rotated the dish clockwise through a complete circle 17 times a second. The time base ran at 2500 pps, which means there are about 147 pulses for every rotation, or about one pulse every 2.5 degrees. The time base was set to start drawing about 0.5 cm from the centre of the tube, so if the brightness is turned all the way up with the scanner running, the result would be a series of closely spaced radial lines forming a sort of sunburst pattern with an empty area in the centre.

For normal operation, the brightness was turned down until the lines just disappear. The output of the radar receiver is fed into the brightness channel, so any echoes caused the display to momentarily brighten, producing a dot on the display known as a blip. The distance of the blip from the centre of the display indicates the range to the target; a target at 9 miles (14 km) would produce a blip near the outer edge of the display. The empty portion in the centre essentially magnifies the close-range area so that blips in this area do not become too cluttered on the display as the fighter approaches its target.

Since the position of the blip is synchronised to the angle of the time base, and the time base to the dish, the angle of the arc relative to the centre indicated the angle to the target; a target above and to the right of the fighter would produce an arc above and to the right of the centre of the display.

The radar beam has a width of about 10 degrees, and sends a pulse every 2.5 degrees of rotation, so a target will not produce a single blip, but a number of them. For targets located far from the centreline, the radar would produce 4 or 5 individual blips as the scanner rotated, causing a short arc about 10 degrees wide to show on the display. A somewhat more complex interaction occurs as the target aircraft approaches the centre of the radar scan. Any target within ten degrees of the centreline will always have some radar energy falling on it no matter where the dish is pointed; a target five degrees to the right of the aircraft would still be reflecting the outer edge of the broadcast even when the scanner is pointed five degrees to the left. In this case, the target will create blips throughout the entire rotation, drawing a complete ring on the display instead of a short arc. Because the antenna is more sensitive in the middle than the edges, the ring on the display will vary in brightness as the dish scans, reaching its maximum when the dish is aimed at the target, and a minimum, or disappearing entirely, when it is pointed the other direction. A target that is dead ahead will produce a complete uninterrupted circle on the display.

The dish does not just spin, but increases and decreases its angle off the centreline as well, reaching a maximum angle of 45 degrees off the centre. The entire scanning pattern takes about one second to complete. This means that targets are not continually updated on the display, but tend to fade in and out over a period of about a second. The area that could be seen during one complete scan was known as the "cone of search".

The system also included a timer that produced blips at set distances, producing rings on the display that were used for distance measurement. There were two settings, one with rings every 2 miles (3.2 km) and another that magnified the display to show only the range from zero to two miles, which was used during the final approach. Additionally, a small amount of leftover signal from the transmitter tended to bleed through to the receiver, causing a strong ring around the centre blank area, known as the "zero ring".

Ground returns caused two effects on the display. One was due to the fact that the dipole was slightly past the outer edge of the dish when it was tilted anywhere close to the centreline, allowing small amounts of the signal to travel directly to the ground and back. The vertical orientation of the antenna reduced this, so the signal was not very powerful. The result was a faint ring on the display at a distance from the centre equal to the altitude of the aircraft, known as the "altitude ring".

The other effect occurred when the dish was pointed towards the ground, causing a strong return that produced a sharp return on the display. Due to the circular scanning pattern, the dish would be pointed to the sides when the beam first struck the ground, continuing to strike the ground while the scanner continued rotating until it is pointed down, and then back up until the beam no longer intersects the ground again. Since the beam strikes the ground at a point closer to the aircraft when it is pointed straight down, the returns during this period are closest to the zero ring. When the reflector rotated further to the sides the beam would strike the ground further away and produce blips further from the zero line. Conveniently, the geometry of the situation causes the returns to form a series of straight lines, producing an effect similar to an artificial horizon.

=== Performance ===
The Mk. VIII produced good returns on bomber sized targets at about 5.5 miles (8.9 km), although it was known to produce returns as far as 6.5 miles (10.5 km) under good conditions. The minimum range was about 400 to 500 feet (120–150 m), limited by the pulse width and the time for the transmitter signal to "die down". At short range the target's arc tended to merge with the zero ring. In these situations it was possible to adjust a bias control to silence the receiver for a slightly longer time, suppressing the zero ring and making nearby targets easier to see.

In directional terms, the beam was sharp enough that the edges of the arc were quite strong - the target would appear in the beam and then disappear with little or no difference in brightness at the edges. This meant that in spite of the relatively wide beam, the arcs were quite sharp and even small angles would cause the signals to disappear at some point and create a gap in the return. With targets near the centre this was quite easy to see as the ring would develop a gap, allowing measurements as accurate as about one degree. However, targets further from the centre displayed much shorter arcs, making it more difficult to see small changes in their length.

=== IFF use ===
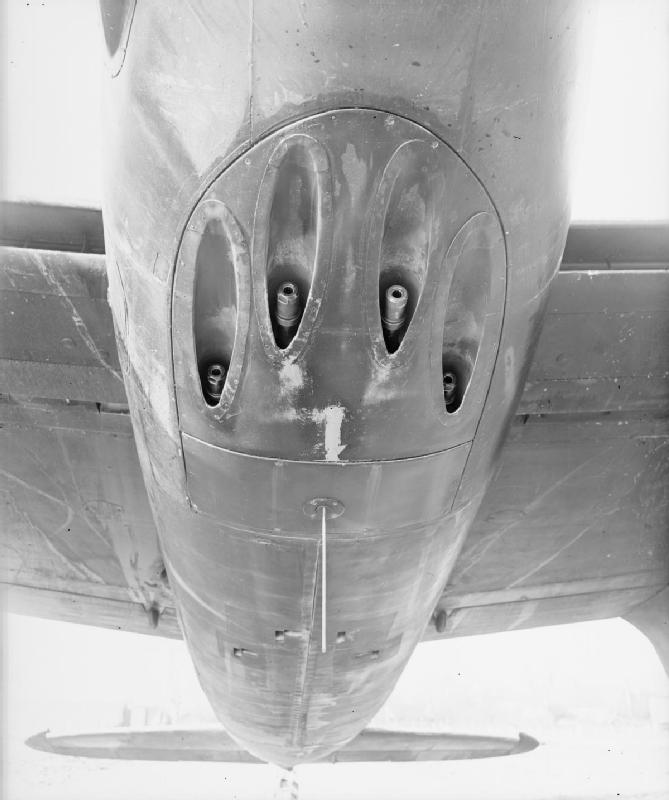
The IFF/Lucero antenna can be seen projecting downward just behind the guns in this image of the lower fuselage of a Mosquito NF.XIII.

Mk. VIII was designed to work with IFF Mk. III, a transponder system that listened for pulses between 160 MHz and 190 MHz and responded with longer pulses on a slightly different frequency. Since the magnetron operated at 3.3 GHz, it would not trigger the IFF system, so a second pulsed transmitter system had to be used in the fighters to support this, the interrogator (or interrogator/responder), code-named Lucero.

Lucero was connected to the Mk. VIII transmitter, and triggered its own 5 μs signal every fifth transmission of the radar. The IFF Mk. III in the remote aircraft contained a receiver circuit fed into a transmitter, causing any received signal to be amplified and stretched out in time. This signal was received by the responder side of Lucero, which mixed it in with the signal from the Mk. VIII's own receiver. Since the Lucero antenna was omnidirectional, the returns were continuous around the entire face of the display and unrelated to the position of the main dish. The result was a series of line segments, spaced every 10 degrees around the display.

Lucero was designed so its transmission would be triggered more rapidly than the radar's magnetron. This allowed it to send its signal and begin receiving the reply during the time when the main radar pulse was in-flight. This meant that the line segments began at a point indicating closer range than the aircraft sending the response, and ended after it. The radar operator could thus tell which aircraft was sending the IFF responses by looking for blips roughly centred along the line segments.

=== Beacons ===
Mk. VIII was also designed to use radio beacons for long-range homing on ground-based transponders. In this case the system was intended to be used with responders operating on the same frequency as the radar, as opposed to the Lucero which had its own frequencies. (Note: The reason for developing separate microwave beacons is unclear in the available sources. Most fighters with Mk. VIII also had Lucero for IFF use, using the same for AIBA, so it would seem little would be needed to use Lucero for beacons as well. This may be related to the development of H2S on bombers, aircraft that would still need beacon services but would not otherwise need a separate system like Lucero. Additional research is required.) Since the dish had to be pointed downwards to see the transponder on the ground, the transponder sent out its response on a slightly different frequency so that it could be distinguished from the ground return.

Since the altitude of the beacon was known, on the ground, the angular display was not needed. Instead, a switch was flipped by a small cam on the scanner as it passed the 12 and 6 o'clock positions in its rotation pattern, causing the receiver output to be inverted. The angular scanning was turned off and the time base re-positioned at the bottom of the screen. Received signals caused the time base to move to the left or right depending on where the dish was pointed at the time the signal was received.

Switching the system to beacon mode slowed the pulse repetition frequency to give the signals more time to travel, stretching the range to 100 miles (160 km). The pulses were also made longer, to keep the total radiated power the same. This switch also caused the strobe to produce markers every 10 miles (16 km) instead of 2.

The system normally switched the receiver to the beacon frequency, but the operator could also switch it to work on the normal transmitter frequency, at which point ground returns would appear. Since water and land produced very different ground returns, using this mode was sometimes useful for finding coastlines, large objects and ships, which it could do at ranges as great as 40 to 50 miles (64–80 km).

=== AIBA ===
The UK had for some time used a blind landing system known as Standard Beam Approach, an adaptation of a pre-war German system known as a Lorenz beam. Lorenz, and Standard, used two radio transmissions that were picked up by conventional voice radio sets. The signals were sent from two directional antennas positioned at the end of the active runway, switching back and forth between the two, spending 0.2 seconds connected to the left antenna (as seen from the aircraft) and then 1 second on the right.

To use Lorenz, the radio operator would tune to the published frequency for that airfield and listen for the signal and try to determine if they heard "dots" or "dashes". If they heard dots, the short 0.2 s pulse, they would know they were too far to the left, and turned to the right in order to reach the centreline. Dashes indicated they should turn left. In the centre the receiver could hear both signals, which merged to form a steady tone, the equisignal.

During development of the earlier Mk. IV system, new versions of the Standard Beam Approach radios were developed that operated on the 1.5 m band, known as Beam Approach Beacon System, or BABS. This was also the band that the earlier IFF Mk. II worked on, and was similar to the new IFF Mk. III bands. For the Mk. VIII radar, it was decided not to make a new microwave-frequency transponder, but simply adapt the Lucero system to receive the BABS signals as well. This was known as AI Beam Approach system, or AIBA.

For AIBA, the Lucero system sent out pulses on 183 MHz, and the BABS responded with 8 μs pulses on 190.5 MHz. These were sent to yet another display mode, with a single vertical time base 8 miles (13 km) long and the strobe providing markers every 2 miles (3.2 km) along it. No switching was used in this mode, instead the signal always caused the beam to deflect to the right, causing a fairly wide bar to appear. Depending on which side of the runway the aircraft was on, the operator would either see long bars for 0.2 second and short ones for 1, or vice versa. If, for instance, the dot signal was longer, this indicated the aircraft was too far to port as the signal was stronger on that side. Using these signals the aircraft could position itself along the centreline, at which point both the dot and dash signals were the same length, and the bar remained steady.
