= Purbeck Valley Folk Festival =

Folk music festival in Dorset, England

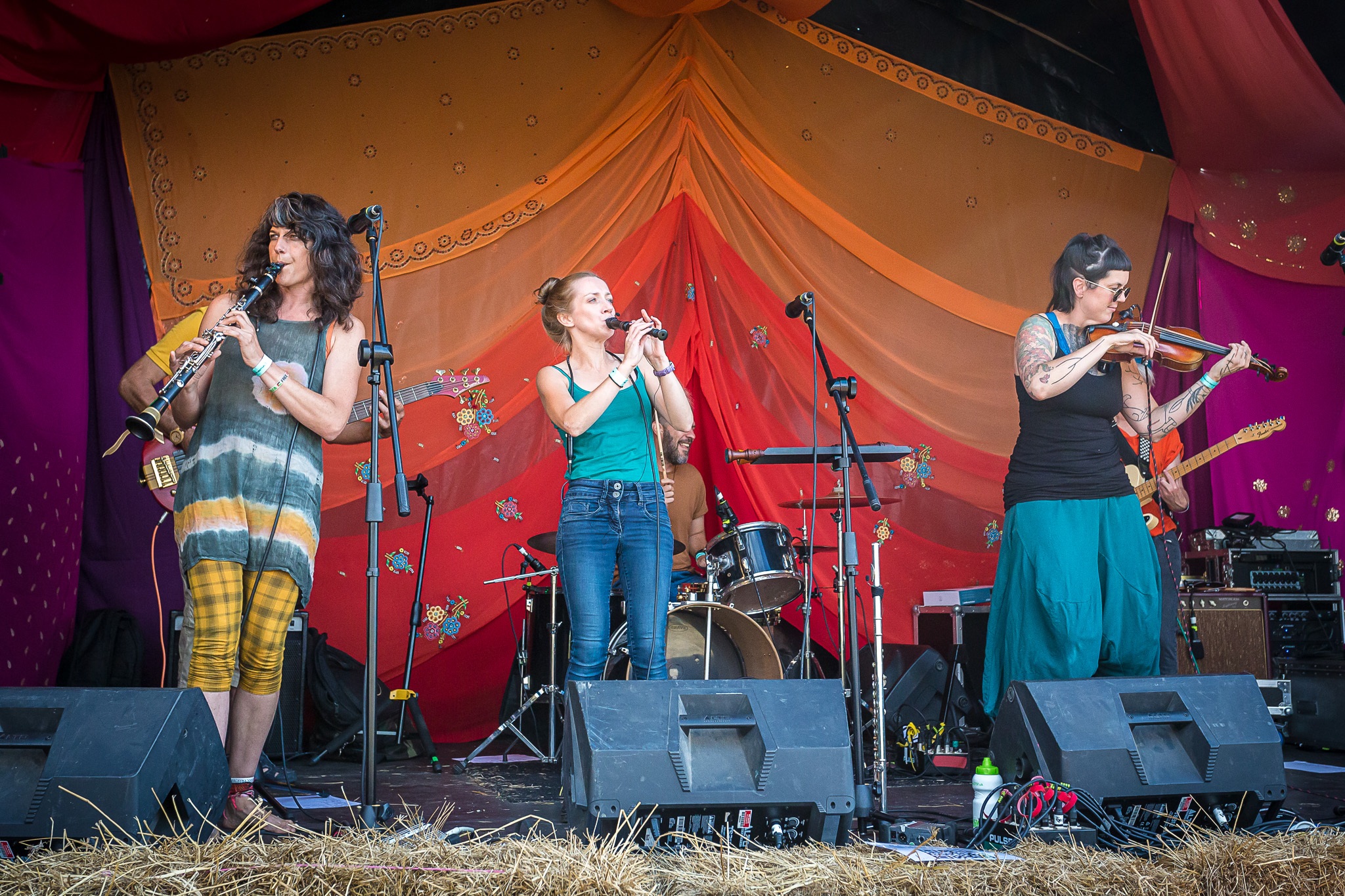
Bonfire Radicals at the Purbeck Valley Folk Festival in 2022

The Purbeck Valley Folk Festival is a folk music festival held on the Isle of Purbeck in Dorset, England.

The inaugural event was organized in August 2009 near Kimmeridge Bay as the Purbeck Folk Festival. In 2014, the festival was held during 22–24 August at Wilkswood Farm, Langton Matravers, and had an attendance of 2,400 visitors. In 2015, the festival adopted its current name and moved to Purbeck Valley Farm in Harman's Cross.

It takes place over three days across five stages, and in addition to the music includes workshops, Purbeck Rising, Purbeck Poetry Slam, a children's area with crafts, storytelling, puppet shows, theatre/games, circus skills and clowns, youth music workshops, a craft area (including crochet, clay, origami, candle, jewellery and tutu making) and a healing area.

== Artists who have appeared at Purbeck Valley Folk Festival ==
Headlining acts at the festivals since 2015 include:

2015: Richard Thompson, Hot Rize, Justin Currie, Stornaway, Chris Difford, Kathryn Tickell and the Side

2016: Villagers, The Proclaimers, Eliza Carthy and the Wayward Band, Kathryn Roberts and Seth Lakeman

2017: Turin Brakes, Gabby Young, Badly Drawn Boy, Kathryn Williams, This is the Kit, Michele Stodart, Lady Maisery and 3 Daft Monkeys

2018: King Creosote, Richard Thompson Electric Set, Beth Orton, Elephant Sessions

2019: Thea Gilmore, Afro Celt Sound System, Cara Dillon Band, 3 Daft Monkeys, Flook

2021: Thea Gilmore, Afro Celt Sound System, Cara Dillon Band, 3 Daft Monkeys, Flook

2022: Jackie Oates and John Spiers, Glenn Ross and The Caverick Sisters

2023: The Magic Numbers, Newton Faulkner, Sarah Jarosz, Seth Lakeman, Kathryn Williams, Lady Nade

== Purbeck Rising ==
Purbeck Rising showcases up and coming talent. It is an opportunity for bands, duos or singer songwriters to perform in front of a panel of judges from other local folk festivals including Wimborne, Wessex and Bridport Folk Festivals, after taking part in a selection process.

Previous performers include:

2023: Aayushi, Amica, Arquebus Trio, The Ashen Keys, Laura Loh, Rachel Hill

2022: Rob Clamp, Megan Linford, Den Miller Music, Igloo Hearts, Anna Renae, 14 Wolves
