= Langton Matravers =

Village in Dorset, England

Coordinates: 50.6089°N 2.0061°W

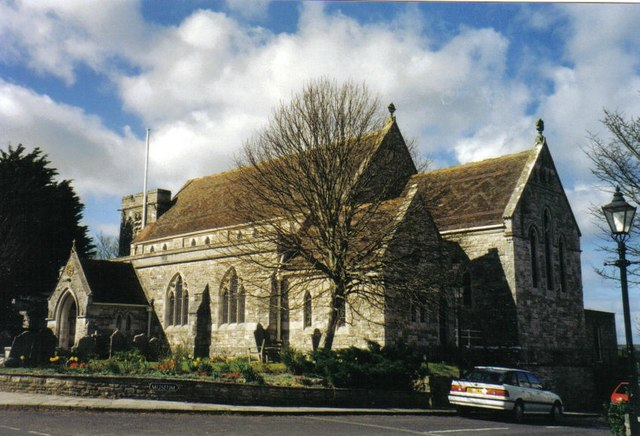
- Parish church of Saint George

- Location within Dorset
- Population: 853 (2011)
- OS grid reference: SY999788
- Civil parish: Langton Matravers
- Unitary authority: Dorset
- Ceremonial county: Dorset
- Region: South West
- Country: England
- Sovereign state: United Kingdom
- Post town: SWANAGE
- Postcode district: BH19
- Dialling code: 01929
- Police: Dorset
- Fire: Dorset and Wiltshire
- Ambulance: South Western
- UK Parliament: South Dorset

Langton Matravers (/məˈtrævərz/) is a village and civil parish on the Isle of Purbeck, in the county of Dorset in the south of England. It is situated about 2 miles (3.2 km) west of Swanage town centre and 5 miles (8 km) south-east of Corfe Castle. In the 2011 Census the civil parish had 381 households and a population of 853.

== History ==
The name Langton stems from "long town", and is first attested in 1206, as Langeton. Matravers stems from the name of John Mautravers who owned the land there in 1281, and ultimately originates from the French "mal traverse".

The Old Malthouse was a preparatory school for boys and, more recently, girls which was founded in 1906, but closed in 2007. Two other preparatory schools Durnford School and Spyway used to be located in the village. Both Durnford and Spyway were closed earlier; Ian Fleming, author of the James Bond novels, was educated at Durnford.

On 2 November 2022, the Ordnance Survey (OS) announced that the historic triple alignment of true, magnetic and grid north had made landfall in the village.

== Governance ==
Langton Matravers is the major part of an electoral ward called Langton. This stretches south to the English Channel and includes Worth Matravers. The total population for the ward at the 2011 Census was 1,491. For governmental purposes, it lies within the Dorset unitary authority and the South Dorset constituency of the House of Commons; until 31 January 2020, it also lay within the South West England constituency of the European Parliament. The first Langton Matravers Parish Council was elected in 1894.

== Amenities ==
=== Education ===
The village is home to St. George's Primary school which was established at the end of the 19th century.

=== Arts ===
The village is within walking distance of the Jurassic Coast. The Purbeck Folk Festival is held annually at a farm near the village.

=== Field studies centre ===
Leeson House, a Grade II listed 19th-century house, is a field studies centre located in the village, it was a pre-prep school for younger boys until the 1960s.

=== Museum ===
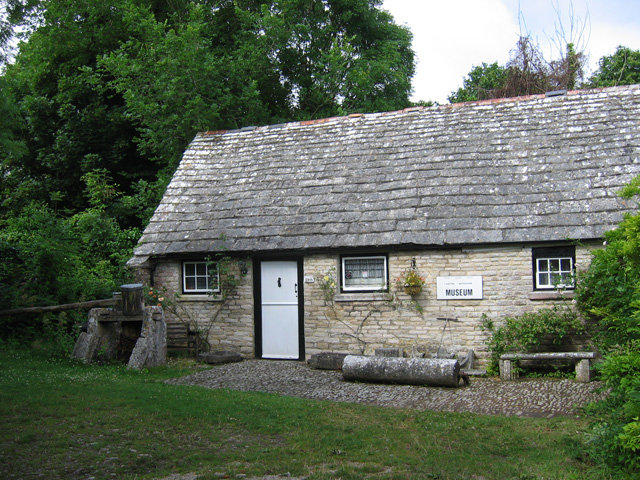
Langton Matravers Museum

Langton Matravers Museum is located in St George's Close, behind the parish church of St George. The museum focuses on the quarrying industry (of Purbeck Marble and Purbeck Limestone) which has historically been important for the village. The museum occupies a former coach house, and houses approximately 25,000 artefacts.
