= Leeson House =

Grade II listed building in Dorset, England

Coordinates: 50°36′27.70″N 1°59′40″W

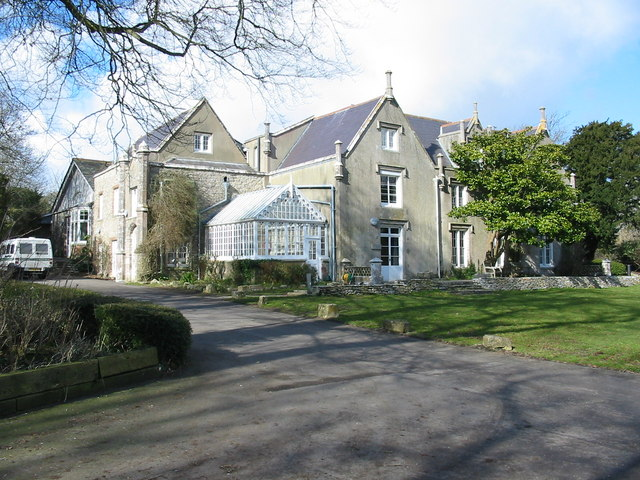
Leeson House

Leeson House is a field studies centre in the village of Langton Matravers in the heart of the Isle of Purbeck, Dorset, England. The Isle of Purbeck forms part of the Jurassic Coast World Heritage Site, designated in 2001. Run as a day and residential centre by Dorset County Council Outdoor Education Service it has been providing environmental education since 1966.

== History ==
There has probably been a dwelling of some sort on or near the site of the present house since Saxon times. The site was recorded in the Domesday Book as 'Lestington', meaning "the farm of the followers of Lest". In 1805 Reverend John Dampier knocked down most of the farmhouse and built a new home, calling it Leeson house. He later sold it to the wealthy Garland family from Poole to use as a second home. In 1903, it was sold again and became a boarding school for girls. In 1940, the girls were sent home during World War II. The house was taken over by the Air Ministry and was used for top secret Radar research. From Leeson they completed the world's first successful tracking of a submarine, in Swanage Bay. Due to concerns about the safety of the project it was moved inland after only 18 months. Several air raid shelters still exist on site. There is a project to convert a bomb shelter to attract the Greater Horseshoe Bat to roost. After the war it became a boy's boarding pre-prep school which closed in 1966. In 1967 Leeson House was officially opened as a Field Studies Centre.

== Facilities ==
The main house is Grade II listed and dates back to the early 19th century. It provides accommodation for up to 60 students plus staff, two dining rooms, two lounges, games/conference hall, changing room/drying room and a separate teaching block with fully equipped field laboratory, a library and two classrooms. The centre has seven acres of private grounds that contain a wide variety of habitats including three ponds, meadows and woodland areas. There is also a bird hide, games field and a small campsite. Deer and badgers are frequent visitors to the grounds and a healthy population of newts reside in the ponds.

== Activities ==
Leeson House runs field study and outdoor education courses for pupils from reception to A level, offering activities tailored for each school.

== Owners and residents ==
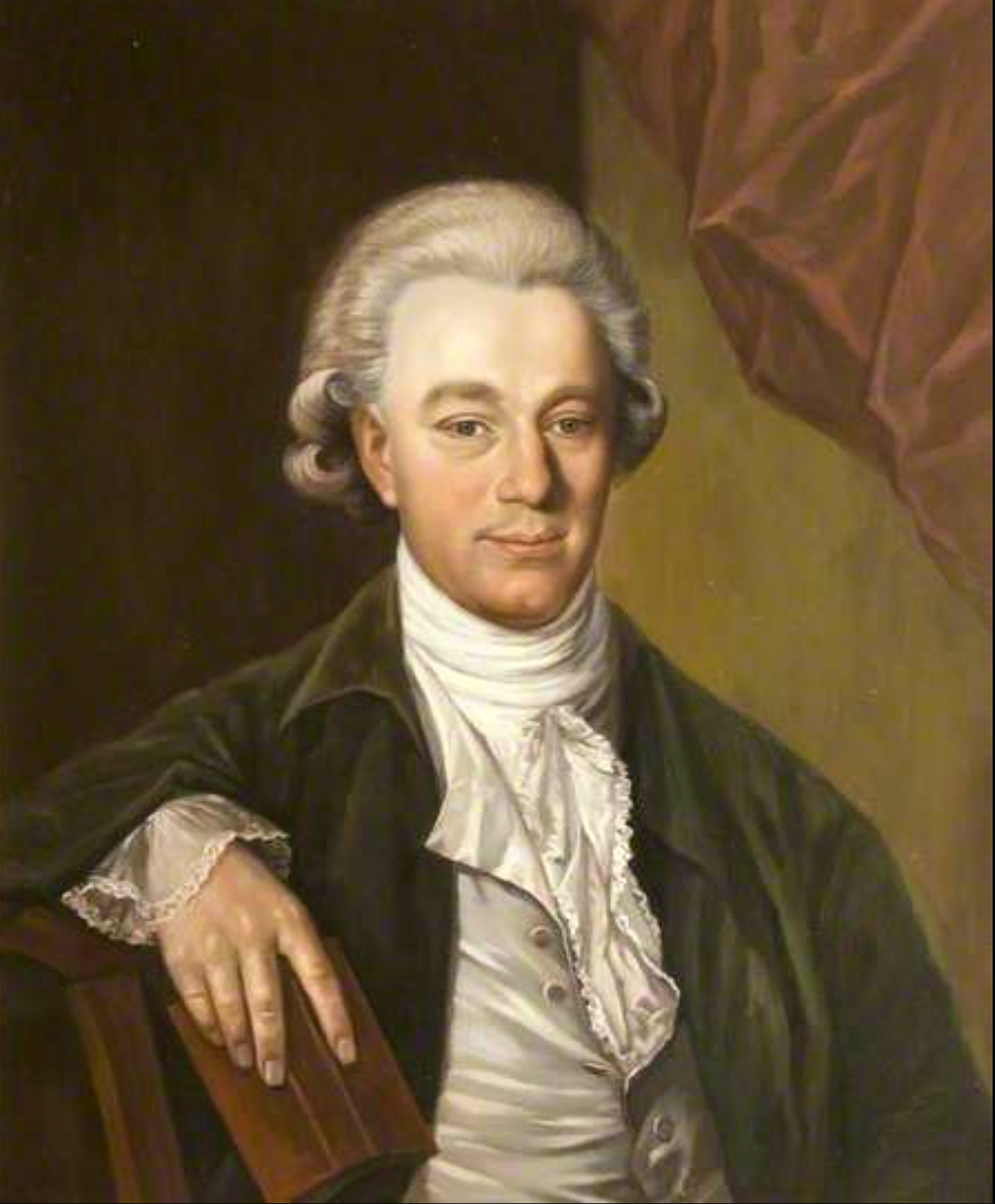
George Garland

Reverend John Dampier (1763-1839) who built the main part of the house in 1805 was from a wealthy family. His father was John Dampier (1734-1811) a merchant and the mayor of Wareham. In 1791 he married Jane Browne (1766-1845) and the couple had thirteen children. Their most famous child was Robert Dampier (1799-1874) who was an artist. He lived in Leeson House between the ages of six and seventeen.

In 1816 Dampier sold the house to George Garland (1753-1825) who was a member of parliament. He was also a merchant with business interests in Newfoundland. In 1779 he married Amy Lester who was the daughter of Benjamin Lester of Poole and Newfoundland. This marriage considerably increased his Newfoundland firm. The couple had eight sons and three daughters. When George died in 1825 he left the property to his eldest son Benjamin Lester Lester (1779-1838) who had changed his surname from Garland to Lester when he inherited from a relative. Benjamin did not marry so when he died in 1838 he left the house to his younger brother Rear Admiral Joseph Gulson Garland (1781-1854). The Tithe map of 1841 records Joseph who was a bachelor as the owner and his brother John Bingley Garland (1791-1875) as the resident of the house. When Joseph died in 1854 he left the property to John. John retained ownership of the house for the next 20 years and then in 1874 sold it to the Earl of Eldon.

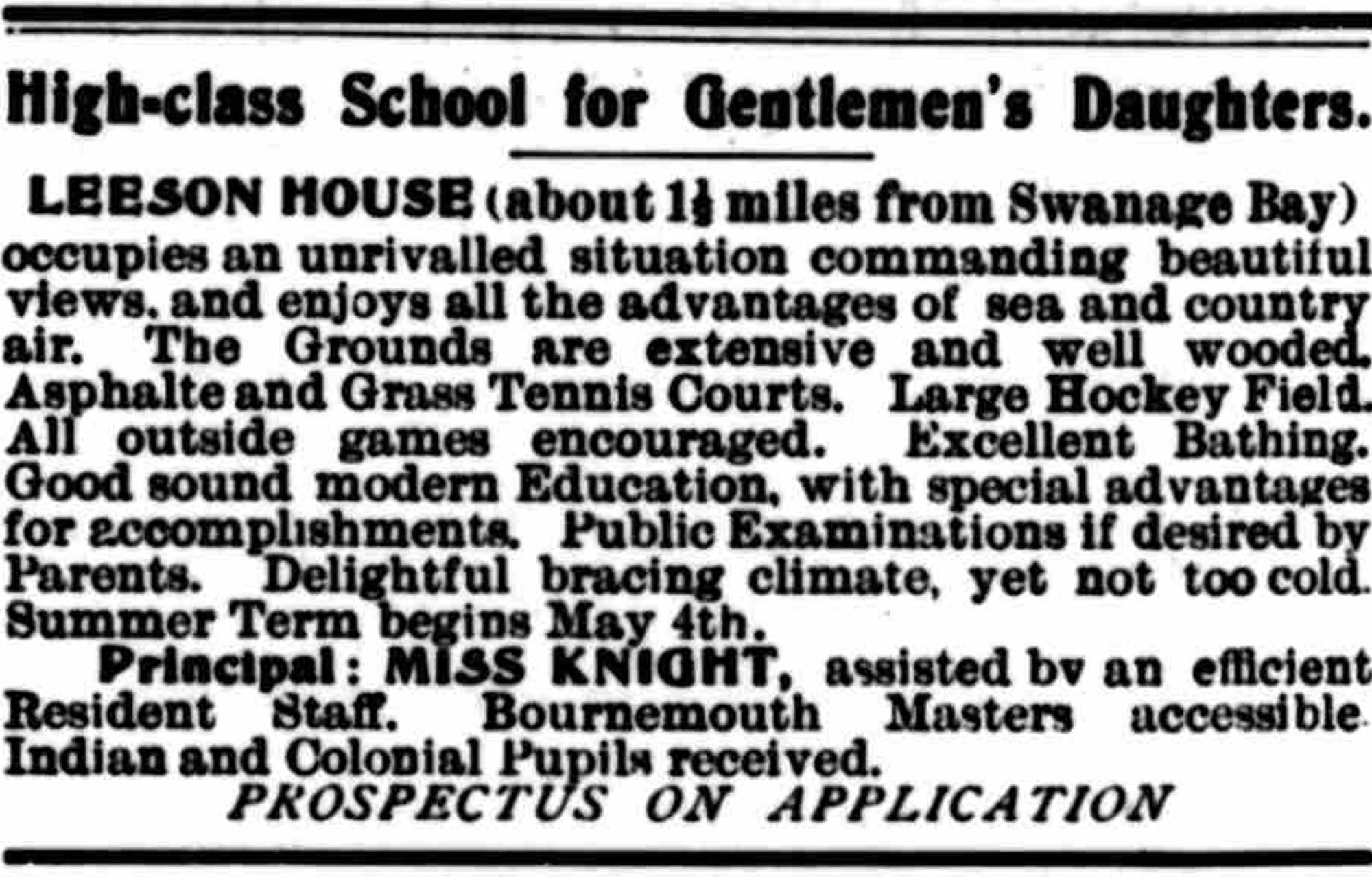
Advertisement for the school in 1906

At this time the Earl of Eldon was John Scott, 3rd Earl of Eldon (1845–1926). He lived in the family seat Encombe House which is nearby and rented Leeson house to tenants. In about 1900 he rented the property to Miss Amy Blanche Knight (1868-1949) who opened it as a girl’s boarding school. An advertisement for the school is shown. She remained there until 1933. She retired in that year and Miss Gabbitas became the headmistress. During this time John Scott died in 1926 and he left the property to his second son Sir Ernest Stowell Scott (1872-1953).

The school girls left the house during the war and the Air Ministry Works Department took over the house to further develop radar equipment. The operation was described from one of the occupants as follows.

"The school occupied a splendid site overlooking the town of Swanage and Swanage Bay with a view of the Isle of Wight in the distance. This was an ideal location for the workers on centimetre wavelengths and soon there was a row of trailers looking like caravans each with a metal parabolic mirror overlooking the town and sea. This became known as “Centimetre Alley” in which was done the most spectacular work in the whole history of radar."

After the war the house became a school for boys and Mr Eustace James Crawshaw was the headmaster. In 1966 the Bournemouth Education Committee, which later became part of Dorset Council, bought Leeson House and in 1967 it opened as the Field Studies Centre.
