= Air-to-surface-vessel radar =

RAF radar classification

Radar, Air to Surface Vessel, or ASV radar for short, is a classification used by the Royal Air Force (RAF) to refer to a series of aircraft-mounted radar systems used to scan the surface of the ocean to locate ships and surfaced submarines. The first examples were developed just before the opening of World War II and they have remained a major instrument on patrol aircraft since that time. It is part of the wider surface-search radar classification, which includes similar radars in ground and ship mountings.

The first ASV was developed after the accidental detection of wharves and cranes while testing an air-to-air radar in 1937. For a variety of reasons, ASV was easier to develop than the air-to-air variety of the same systems, and the first operational use of the Mark I followed in early 1940. A cleaned-up and repackaged version, ASV Mark II, replaced it at the end of the year, but the system was not widespread until late in 1941.

ASV was useful for detecting U-boats at night, but the target had to be seen to be attacked, a problem that was addressed with the Leigh light with rapidly increasing success. As German U-boat losses shot up in 1942, they concluded the RAF was using radar to detect them and responded with the Metox radar detector. The RAF responded by deploying the microwave-frequency ASV Mark III, which the Germans were unable to detect until the U-boat fleet had already been decimated. A series of other ASVs were developed for different aircraft as the war progressed.

In the post-war era, several new ASV radars were developed, notably ASV Mark 7A, ASV Mark 13 and ASV Mark 21. By the late 1960s the original terminology was no longer being used, and the last major entries in the series were known simply as Searchwater and Seaspray.

== WWII developments ==
=== Initial concept ===
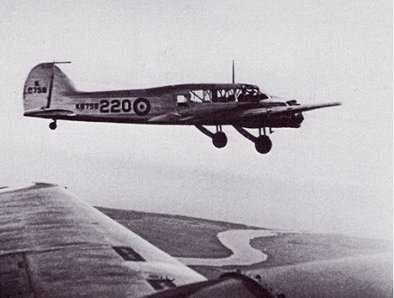
Avro Anson K8758 demonstrated ASV in commanding fashion in September 1937.

Development of the original ASV systems started in 1937 after the team testing an experimental air-to-air radar noticed odd returns while flying near the shore of the North Sea. They eventually realized these were the docks and cranes at the Harwich docks miles south of them. Shipping also appeared, but the team was unable to test this very well as their Handley Page Heyford was forbidden to fly over water.

To further test the concept, Robert Watson-Watt provided the team with two Avro Ansons that were able to fly out over the North Sea from nearby RAF Martlesham Heath. The testing was crude; a small dipole antenna was hand held outside one of the escape hatches and rotated looking for when the signal disappeared, indicating the antenna was aligned with the target ship. This was not easy as the signal naturally fluctuated. The first successes were in August 1937.

After several successful flights over the summer, Watt asked the team if they could be ready for a demonstration in September. On 4 September, the system was used to detect Royal Navy ships on manoeuvres in almost complete overcast. The weather was so bad they had to use the radar pattern from local sea-side cliffs to navigate home. Albert Percival Rowe of the Tizard Committee later commented that "This, had they known, was the writing on the wall for the German Submarine Service."

=== Mark I and II ===
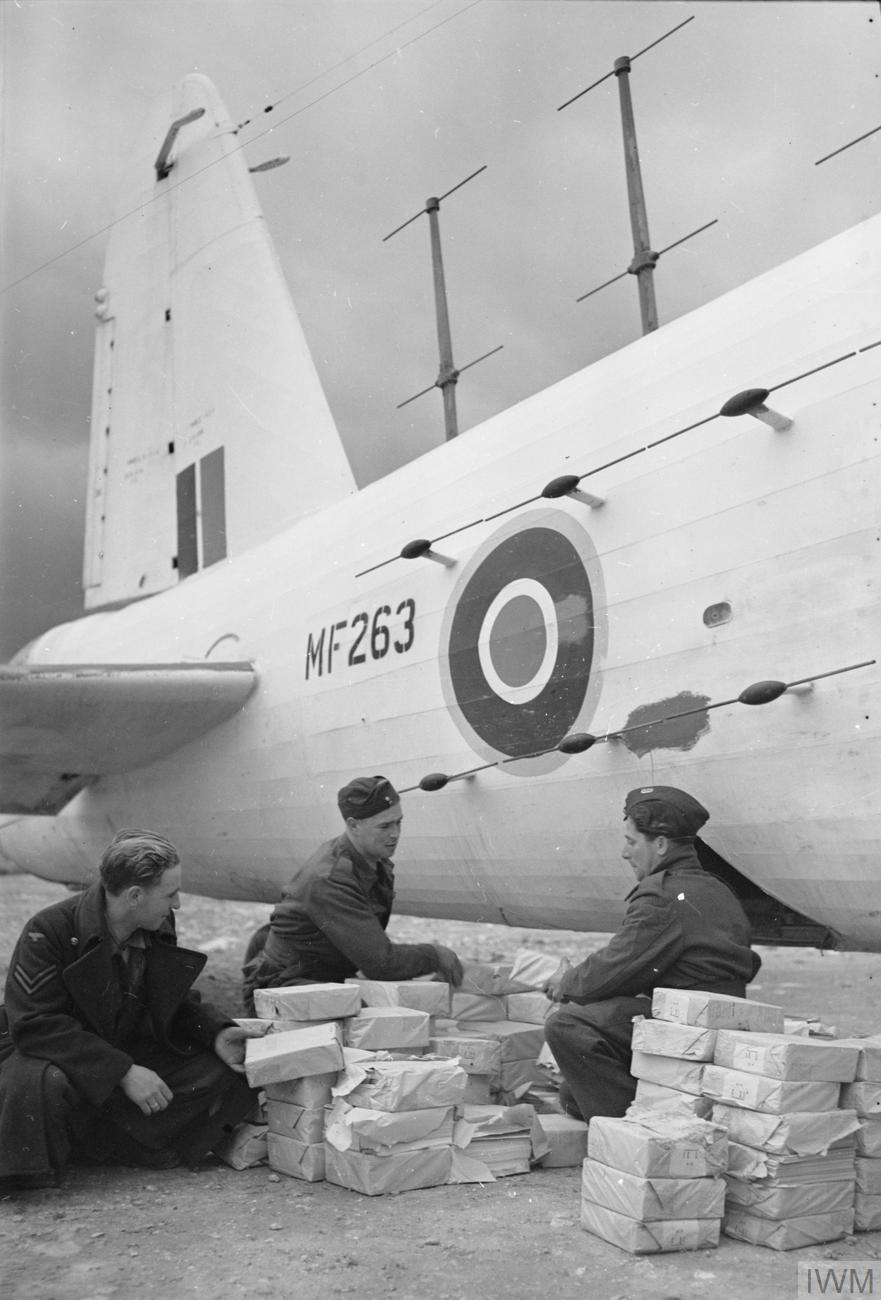
The antenna array of the Mark II was quite large and produced considerable drag.

Production quality sets were available in 1939 and entered operational service in early 1940, becoming the first radar system to be mounted on an aircraft in a combat setting. A somewhat improved version, Mark II, followed in 1941, which saw tens of thousands of units produced in the UK, Canada, US and Australia.

These designs had a relatively long minimum range, meaning the submarine targets disappeared from the display just as the aircraft was readying for the attack. At night, this allowed the submarines to escape attack by maneuvering when an aircraft could be heard. This was solved by the Leigh Light, a searchlight that lit up the submarines during the last seconds of the approach. By early 1942, Mark II and the Leigh Light were finally available on large numbers of aircraft. Their effect was dramatic; German U-boats had previously been almost completely safe at night, and could operate out of the Bay of Biscay in spite of it being close to British shores. By the spring of 1942, Biscay was increasingly dangerous, with aircraft appearing out of nowhere in the middle of the night, dropping bombs and depth charges, and then disappearing again in moments.

The Germans ultimately solved the problem of Mark II with the introduction of the Metox radar detector. This amplified the radar's pulses and played them into the radio operator's headphones. It provided this warning long before the echos from the submarine became visible on the aircraft's display. With experience, the operators could tell whether the aircraft was approaching or just flying by, allowing the U-boat to dive and escape detection. By the end of 1942, Mark II had been rendered ineffective.

=== Mark III ===
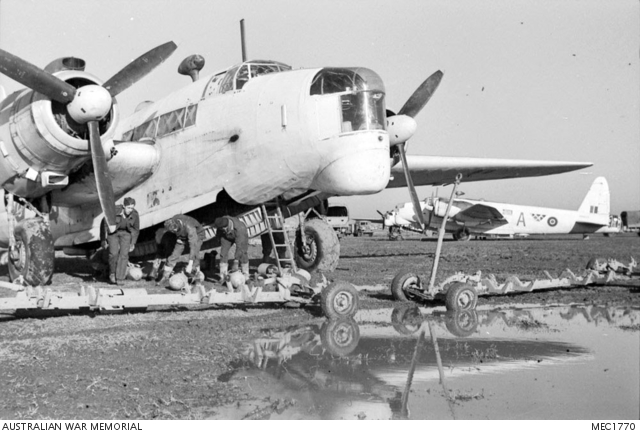
The Mark III's small antenna was installed in a well-streamlined radome on the nose of the Wellington, forcing the removal of the guns in that location.

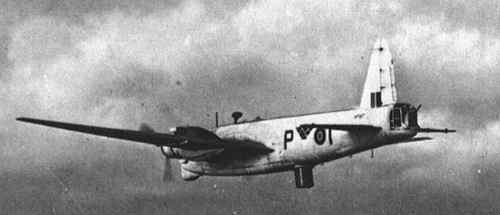
With the radome of the Mark III well streamlined, the Leigh light installation was also cleaned up by placing it in a retractable "dustbin".

The introduction of the cavity magnetron in early 1940 led to efforts to develop microwave-frequency versions of the various radars then in use, including a new ASV under the name ASVS for "Sentimetric". A prototype was available from Metrovick in the summer of 1942, but they predicted it would not be widely available until summer 1943.

It was at this point that the Metox started to become effective. Robert Hanbury Brown suggested a new ASV could be quickly introduced by making minor changes to the new H2S radar, mostly to the antenna. This started a furious debate between RAF Bomber Command, who wanted every H2S for their bombers, and RAF Coastal Command, who wanted them for submarine hunting.

After several changes in policy, the first ASV Mark III's began arriving in March 1943, and had largely replaced the Mark II in front-line units by the end of the summer. The Germans had no way to detect these signals, and their submarines were repeatedly attacked with no warning. The losses were so great they took to leaving port in the day, but the RAF responded with strike aircraft patrols and losses shot up once again. In August, shipping losses to submarines was the lowest since November 1941, and more U-boats were sunk than cargo ships.

The Germans spent much of the rest of the year using radar detectors at longer wavelengths in a fruitless attempt to find the new ASV. Further confusion was added by a captured Coastal Command pilot, who related that ASV was no longer used for search, but only in the last minutes of the approach. Instead, their aircraft were using a receiver tuned to the Metox intermediate frequency that allowed them to detect the submarines at as much as 90 miles (140 km). This led to an urgent 13 August 1943 message from German Naval High Command ordering that submarines turn off their Metox. This incredible deception not only further delayed the German discovery of the true nature of the problem but also allowed Mark II to once again become effective. Accepting this as an accurate report, it must rank among the most successful deceptions in military history. The amount of Intermediate Frequency signal just before the detector (where it is at its maximum) would be under a watt in power. Any such signal, from within an equipment cabinet inside a submarine, could only reach the outer air by conduction back past the converter stage, up the antenna feedline and finally by radiation from the antenna. Readers with common levels of theoretical electronics understanding may consider this scenario unlikely. The successful deception must be considered a masterstroke of strategic importance.

The reason for the long delay in discovering Mark III is somewhat surprising given that a magnetron from H2S fell into German hands almost immediately after it was first used in February 1943. Sources disagree on the reason; the magnetron was either unknown to the German Navy, or they did not believe it could be used against U-boats. It was not until late 1943 that a naval version of the Naxos radar detector arrived, having originally been developed to allow German night fighters to track the RAF's H2S radars. Naxos provided very short detection range, about 8 kilometres (5.0 mi), too short to be really useful. Better detectors arrived very late in the war, but by that time the U-boat force had largely been destroyed.

=== Other WWII developments ===
The magnetron was revealed to the United States in 1940 during the Tizard Mission, and local development began at the MIT Radiation Laboratory in a matter of weeks. US development was not subject to the infighting in the RAF, but suffered its own series of setbacks and confusion. The early DMS-1000 proved to be an excellent unit, but for reasons unknown, the US War Department decided to put the inferior Western Electric SCR-517 into production instead. Meanwhile, Philco had been developing a system for blimps, the ASG, which was much better than the SCR-517.

The RAF decided that UK-built aircraft would be fitted with their Mk. III, while any US aircraft in British service would use US sets. Initially, they planned on using the Consolidated B-24 Liberator, which had the range to operate over the Mid-Atlantic Gap, and an example of this aircraft with the DMS-1000 was sent to the UK for testing in early 1942. Another 30 arrived with a mix of DMS-1000, SCR-517 and ASG. However, when Bomber Command decided the Boeing B-17 Flying Fortress was unsuitable for bombing operations, the Air Ministry ordered Coastal Command to take over their existing orders in spite of them having a shorter range that was unsuitable for closing the Gap. Coastal Command was able to have the radar switched to the ASG, which they operated under the name ASV Mark V.

The TRE was sure the Germans would soon detect Mark III and render it ineffective as well, so they responded with a new ASV Mark VI that was essentially a more-powerful Mark III. The key trick to Mark VI was the "Vixen" device that allowed the operator to progressively mute the output as they approached the U-boat, hopefully fooling the radio operator into believing they were flying away. Mark VI never fully replaced Mark III in service, as truly effective detectors did not become available until the U-boat fleet had largely been destroyed. The failure of Naxos and later devices led to morale problems in the U-boat force.

Another solution to the problem of being detected was to change frequencies. From 1943, both the UK and US began developing magnetrons that worked on even shorter wavelengths, first in the X-band at 3 cm wavelength, and later in the K-band at 1.25 cm. The UK-developed 3 cm version for the Liberator became ASV Mark VII, while the US version based on ASG was known as AN/APS-15 and given the UK designation ASV Mark X. It was expected the latter would be available in December 1943. The similar AN/APS-3 was mounted to Catalinas and named ASV Mark VIII.

=== Late-war developments ===
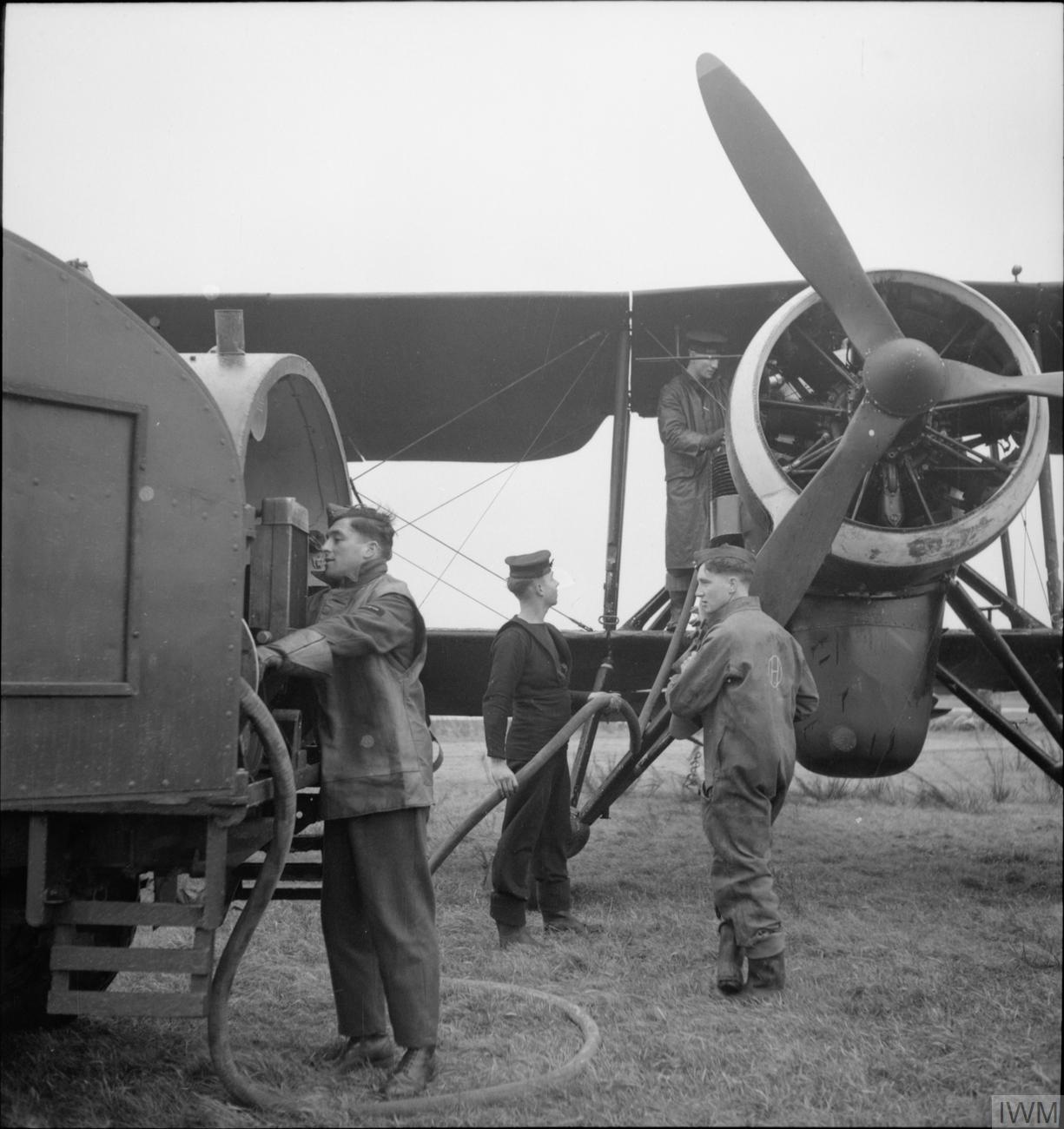
The Swordfish mounted the ASV Mark XI radome between its landing gear.

In October 1944, the Germans introduced two innovations that were extremely worrying. One was the introduction of new classes of U-boats with much higher performance, and the other was the use of the schnorkel, allowing even older types to spend most of their time submerged. This made the X-band versions of ASV a requirement, as they had the resolution needed to detect the schnorkel.

On 22 November 1944, it was decided to deploy new 3 cm-band ASV's, with both the UK and US developing versions. However, these demonstrated poor performance against the schnorkel, and experiments with these new systems were still underway when the war ended. In the immediate post-war era, development of the system continued as an air-sea rescue system, as it could detect life rafts even if they did not carry a transponder.

In order to upgrade the Fairey Swordfish, which had previously used the early Mark II radars, the Mark X was further adapted as the Mark XI. This used a new narrow radome that fit between the Swordfish's landing gear. The radome's location made the carriage of a torpedo impossible, so these aircraft were fit with eight RP-3 rockets with armor-piercing warheads to damage or puncture the U-boat making it impossible to dive, and flares to mark the location for follow-up attacks by other aircraft carrying depth charges. Further developments of this system led to the Mark XIII, used on de Havilland Mosquitos, Bristol Beaufighters and Bristol Brigands.

The Beaufighter, which became one of Coastal Command's primary strike fighters, had the problem that the fitting of ASV required the removal of some other devices to make room. Previously they had carried a long-distance radio for remaining in contact with their base, as well as a Gee system for navigation. Neither could be safely removed, and the desire for a much smaller ASV for this role developed. This was fulfilled with the Mark XVI, built in the US as LHTR and supplied under lend-lease. This was a very simple system originally intended to indicate a selected range to the pilot, which proved very useful for timing bomb drops. Trials were carried out in August 1944 and experimental fits were made to the Beaufighter, Mosquito and Fleet Air Arm Avengers.

== Post-war developments ==
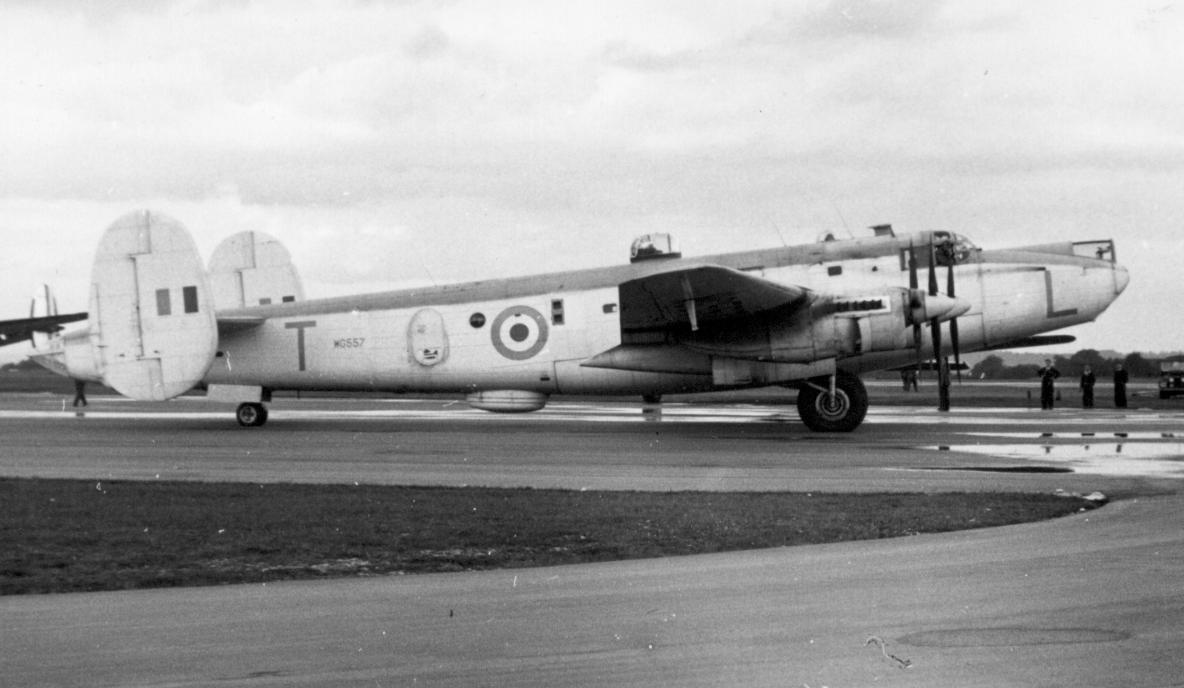
The Shackleton MR2 moved its Mark 13 radar to the ventral position in a well-streamlined installation.

With the ending of World War II in 1945, the British believed another war was at least a decade off, and put little effort into new radar systems. The opening of the Cold War led to a rapid re-evaluation of this stance, especially as the Soviets were known to be introducing new submarines surpassing even the late-war German designs.

Adding to the problem was the loss of the large numbers of Liberator aircraft with the ending of lend-lease. These had been used as very long-range patrol aircraft during the war, and their return to the US left Coastal Command with no suitable airframes to cover the GIUK gap. A solution was found by adapting surplus Bomber Command Avro Lancaster bombers with Mark VII to become the Lancaster GR.3. The use of Roman numerals had become passé by this point, and these units were referred to as ASV Mark 7A, remaining in service until 1954.

A more suitable custom-built patrol aircraft was a priority and led to the Avro Shackleton. The Shackleton Mk 1 and 2 mounted the ASV Mark 13 (ASV13). The main improvements were the addition of stabilization so the image did not change when the aircraft manoeuvred, and the use of a pressurised radome that kept out humidity and made it suitable for use in tropical areas. ASV13 was a centimetric radar with a detection range in a calm sea (Sea State 1) of about 40 nautical miles (74 km) for a destroyer, 20 nautical miles (37 km) for a surfaced submarine, and 8 nautical miles (15 km) for a submarine conning tower. "In rougher conditions, the range would be much less." By 1958, ASV13 was considered "old and rather unreliable".

EMI developed a replacement, ASV Mark 21 (ASV21), which was cleared for service use in 1958, and came into operational use in the Shackleton Mk 2 and 3 beginning in 1959. ASV21 could detect a submarine schnorkel at 15 nautical miles (28 km) "in very favourable conditions but at much shorter range in the sea states normally experienced in the North Atlantic." ASV21 was generally similar to the earlier designs. ASV21 was also selected for the Mark II models of the Canadair CP-107 Argus, replacing the American AN/APS-20 of the Argus Mark I's. The Argus was widely described as the best anti-submarine aircraft of its era. ASV21D also equipped the Hawker Siddeley Nimrod MR 1 when it came into service in 1970, and was replaced by the Searchwater radar in the Nimrod MR 2 starting in 1980. ASV 21 remained in service on the Argus until the last example retired in 1981.

== Later developments ==
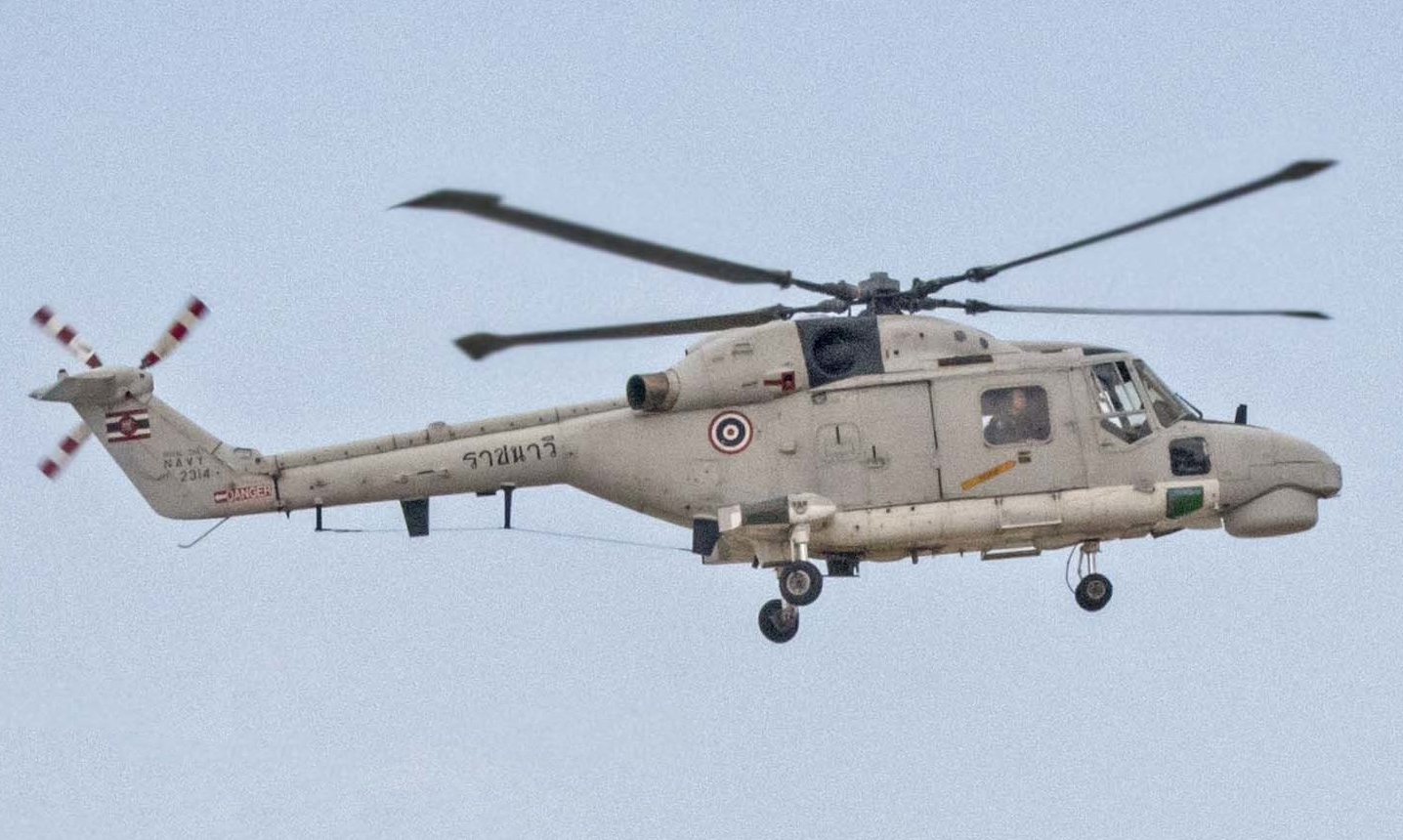
Seaspray on the Lynx was an export success, seen here in the Royal Thai Navy.

The war-era radar classifications became less relevant in the 1970s as radar units increasingly became multi-purpose as opposed to being single-role. Newer designs, even dedicated naval surveillance designs, were not assigned numbers in the ASV lineage. The first such example is the Seaspray, a small unit designed to be mounted on the Westland Lynx. This was originally developed in concert with the Sea Skua missile to allow the Lynx to attack fast attack craft at long range from their carrier ships. It has since been sold around the world and used in a variety of roles. The latest versions, Seaspray 7000, are completely rebuilt and share only the name with the original models.

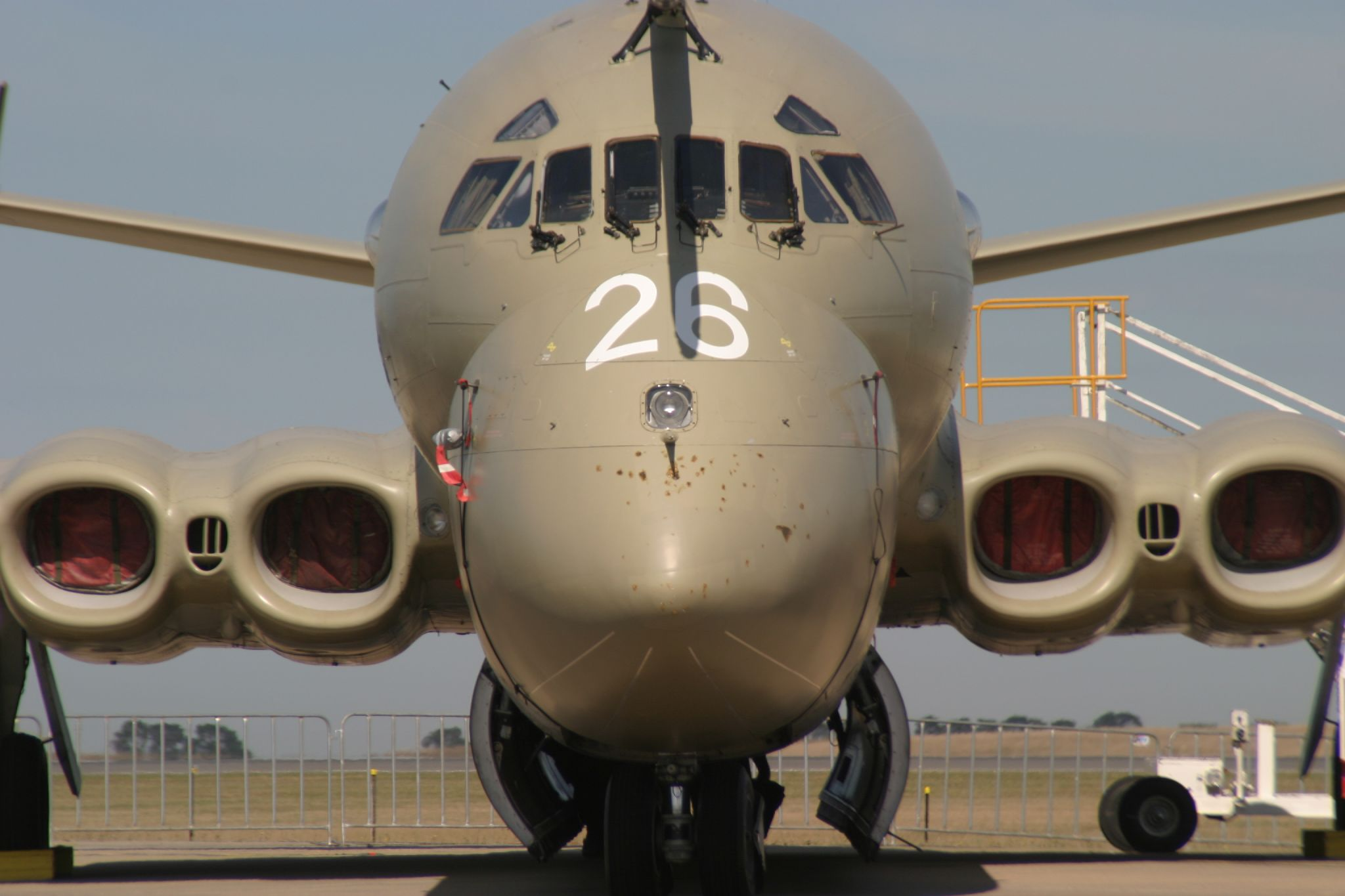
Radar returned to the nose in the Nimrod, with this MR2 showing no outward sign of the Searchwater radar within.

Another example is the Searchwater, which was designed to replace the Mk. 21 in a new version of the Nimrod, the MR2. These began arriving in 1979. In 1978, the Royal Navy retired its fleet carriers, losing the Fairey Gannet AEW.3 airborne early warning aircraft. A new version of Searchwater, the LAST, was created to provide this coverage when mounted under a Westland Sea King helicopter that was able to operate from a variety of ships. Several greatly improved versions followed, part of the Searchwater 2000 series.

ASV13 and ASV21 used magnetrons, which was a technology developed during World War II. "Searchwater was a completely new concept, having a high power wideband TWT transmitter and being the first generation of ASV radars to include modern signal and data processing (digital as well as analogue)". This gave Searchwater a better ability than ASV13 or ASV21 to detect small targets such as submarine periscopes against a background of strong sea returns. The radar screen for Searchwater could be viewed in daylight, unlike the screen of ASV21, which was viewed in a radar 'tent' on board the aircraft.

== System list ==
From Watts and Smith:

- ASV Mark I - 1.5 m VHF, 300 prototype sets built in 1940
- ASV Mark II - production version of Mark I; ~23,000 produced
  - ASV Mark IIA - Mk. II with more powerful 100 kW transmitter; 12 produced
- ASV Mark III - centimetric radar based on H2S; widely used from March 1943 onwards
  - Mark IIIA - improved version available from late 1943
  - Mark IIIB - Mk. IIIA with internal modifications allowing the same unit to be used by Coastal or Bomber command
  - Mark IIIC - Mk. III for Sunderland using two scanners
- ASV Mark IV - RAF name for the US DMS-1000; largely withdrawn by late 1943 in favour of Mk. V
- ASV Mark V - RAF name for US APG (AN/APS-2) radars used on Liberators and Fortresses
  - ASV Mark VA - improved ASG.3/APS-2
- ASV Mark VI - high-power Mk. III with 200 kW magnetron, "Vixen", and stabilization
  - ASV Mark VIA - added lock-follow which could direct the Leigh light, a separate pilot indicator, and blind-bombing
  - ASV Mark VIB - production version of the Mk. VIA
  - ASV Mark VIC - version of Mk. VI for Sunderland
- ASV Mark VII - largely similar to Mk. III but operating in the X-band at 3 cm; not widely used
  - ASV Mark 7A - post-war version used on Lancaster GRs
- ASV Mark VIII - RAF name for US AN/APS-3 radars; used mainly on Catalinas from June 1944
- ASV Mark IX - RAF name for US ASH, later known as AN/APS-4
- ASV Mark X - RAF name for US ASD-1/APS-15 X-band system; used primarily on Liberators; not to be confused with ASVX
  - ASV Mark XA - APS-5A, minor improvements
- ASV Mark XI - originally known as ASVX, X-band design for Barracuda but used primarily on Swordfish
- ASV Mark XII - modified AI Mk. VIII radar for Beaufighter strike fighters
- ASV Mark XIII - modified Mk. XI for Mosquito, Beaufighter and Brigand; did not enter service before war ended
  - ASV Mark 13A - post-war version used on Shackleton Mk 1, and Shackleton Mk 2
- ASV Mark XIV - unknown
- ASV Mark XV - miniaturized version of XI; did not enter service but acted as the basis for future designs
- ASV Mark XVI - RAF name for US LHTR, a range-only unit used by strike fighters
- ASV Mark 19A - made by Echo for the Royal Navy Gannet and Sea Prince aircraft
- ASV Mark 21 - new design by EMI used on Canadair CP-107 Argus Mk II, Shackleton Mk 3, and retrofitted to Shackleton Mk 2,
- ASV Mark 21D - modified version fitted to Nimrod MR1
