= ASV Mark III radar =

British WWII anti-submarine search radar

ASV Mark III
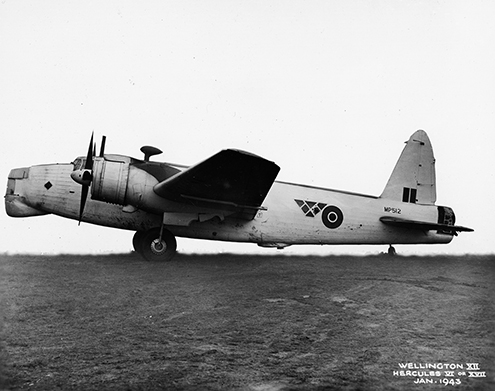
- Wellington XII MP512 was one of the first aircraft to be fitted with ASV Mk. III
- Country of origin: UK
- Introduced: 1943
- Type: Sea-surface search
- Frequency: 3300 ±50 MHz (S-band)
- PRF: 660 pps
- Beamwidth: ~10º horizontal, ~15º vertical
- Pulsewidth: 1 μs
- RPM: 60 rpm
- Range: 1 to 100 miles (1.6–160.9 km)
- Diameter: 28 in (0.71 m)
- Azimuth: 320º
- Precision: ~5º
- Power: 40 kW
- Other names: ARI.5119, ARI.5153
- Related: ASV Mark VI

Radar, Air-to-Surface Vessel, Mark III, or ASV Mk. III for short, was a surface search radar system used by RAF Coastal Command during World War II. It was a slightly modified version of the H2S radar used by RAF Bomber Command, with minor changes to the antenna to make it more useful for the anti-submarine role. It was Coastal Command's primary radar from the spring of 1943 until the end of the war. Several improved versions were introduced, notably the ASV Mark VI, which replaced most Mk. IIIs from 1944 and ASV Mark VII radar, which saw only limited use until the post-war era.

Coastal Command's first radar was ASV Mark I, which began experimental use in 1939. Minor improvements were made for the Mark II in 1940 but it was not widely available until late 1941. Having realized that the RAF was using radar to detect their U-boats, in the summer of 1942 the Germans introduced the Metox radar detector to listen for their signals. This gave the submarine a warning of the aircraft approach long before the submarine became visible on the aircraft's radar display. The RAF noticed this in early autumn when crews reported with increasing frequency that they would detect submarines that would disappear as they approached.

An ASV working in microwave frequencies using the new cavity magnetron had been under development for some time at this point, known as ASVS, but had not matured for various reasons. Robert Hanbury Brown suggested using H2S for ASV but this had been rejected by Bomber Command, who wanted all the sets for themselves. Brown continued development with EMI and presented it again in late 1942 when Metox negated the earlier marks of ASV. Obstruction by Bomber Command led to more delays and it was not until March 1943 that the first dozen aircraft were operational. Deliveries were rapid after this point and Mk. II had been largely replaced by the end of the summer.

The Germans had no way to detect the signals from Mark III, which operated in the 10 cm band compared to the 1.5 m wavelength of the Mk. II. Further confusion was caused by a captured RAF officer who stated they carried a device that could detect the Metox radar detector. Combined with other anti-submarine technologies introduced around the same time, submarine losses shot up in the late spring of 1943. By the time that the Germans realised what the British had done, the German U-boat force was almost destroyed and the Battle of the Atlantic was entering its final phase. Naxos, a microwave detector, was introduced in October 1943 but it was nowhere near as sensitive as Metox and had little effect on events; Mark III continued to guide the majority of Coastal Command's fleet until the end of the war.

== Development ==
=== Mark II ===
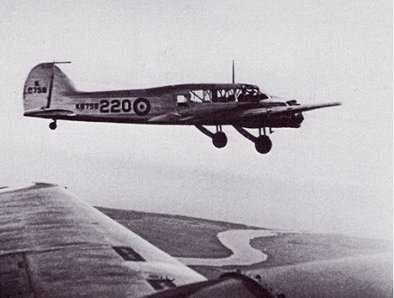
Avro Anson K8758, as seen from K6260. The experimental radar on K6260 led development of ASV.

Development of the original ASV systems started in 1937, after the team testing an experimental air-to-air radar noticed odd returns while flying near the shore of the English Channel. They eventually realized these were the docks and cranes at the Harwich docks miles south of them. Shipping also appeared but the team was unable to test this very well as their Handley Page Heyford was forbidden to fly over water. To address this problem, further testing was carried out on two Avro Anson patrol aircraft. The system was crude, with a simple dipole antenna being held out a window and swung by hand to find returns.

For several reasons, the 1.5 m wavelength of the radar system worked better over water than land; notably the large area and flat vertical sides of the ships made excellent radar targets. After some additional development of suitable antennas, the system was largely ready for production by early 1939. Production quality sets were available in late 1939 and entered operational service in January 1940, becoming the first aircraft radar system to be used in combat. A somewhat improved version, Mark II, followed in 1941.

The ASV designs had a relatively long minimum range, meaning the submarine targets disappeared from the display just as the aircraft was closing for the attack. At night this allowed the submarines to escape. This problem was solved by the Leigh Light, a searchlight that lit up the submarines during the last seconds of the approach. By early 1942, ASV Mark II and the Leigh Light had been installed on large numbers of aircraft, just in time for the winter hiatus to end. German U-boats had previously been safe at night and could operate from the Bay of Biscay in spite of it being close to British shores. By the spring of 1942, Biscay was a deathtrap; aircraft would appear out of nowhere in the middle of the night, drop bombs and depth charges, and then disappear again in moments.

The Germans defeated ASV Mark II by the end of 1942 with the introduction of the Metox radar detector. This amplified the radar's pulses and played them into the radio operator's headphones. With experience, the operators could tell whether the aircraft was approaching or just flying by. It provided this warning long before the echoes off the submarine became visible on the aircraft's display, allowing the U-boat to dive and escape detection.

=== ASVS, original Mark III ===
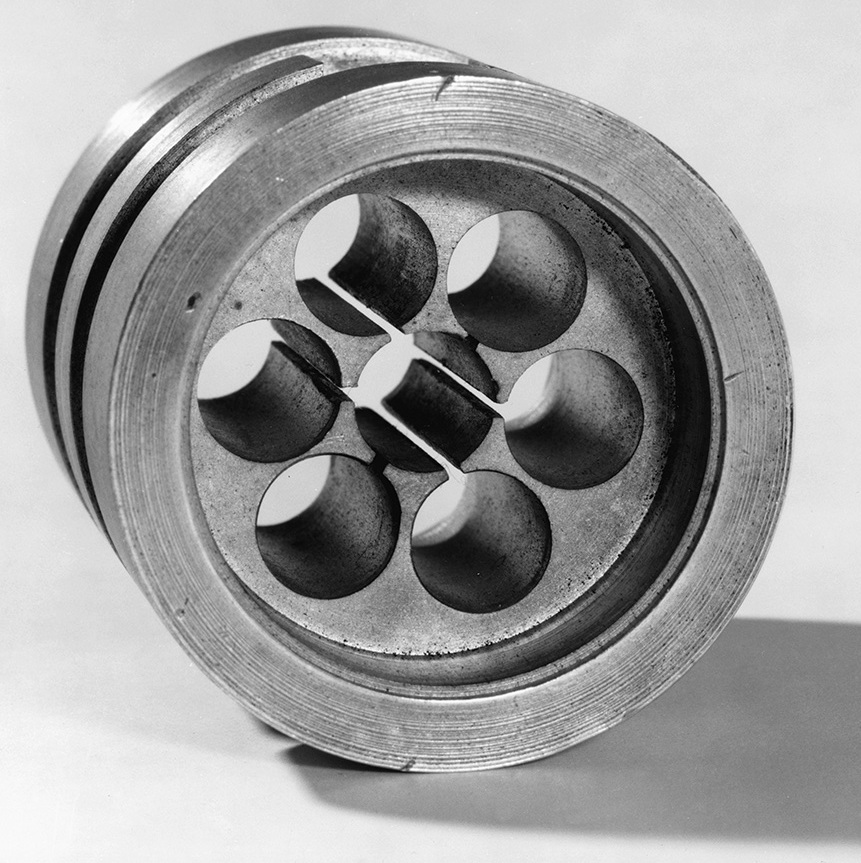
When placed between the poles of a powerful horseshoe magnet, this simple copper block produced many kilowatts of microwave signals, revolutionizing radar.

After the early 1940 invention of the cavity magnetron, which produced microwaves at around 10 cm, all of the British forces began development of radars using these devices. Among these were the Air Ministry teams who had developed AI and ASV turned their attention to AIS, the S standing for "senitmetric". Tests in April 1941 with early lash-up devices against HMS Sealion showed they could detect semi-submerged submarines at several miles range.

In June 1941 a formal application was made to Robert Watson-Watt to form a separate group to develop an ASVS. This was initially a version of the Mark II with the minimal conversions needed to use the magnetron as the transmitter. This would otherwise operate like the Mark II, with the relative strength of the returns on two antennas being used to determine the rough bearing of the target; if the return on the left antenna was slightly stronger, the target was somewhere to the left of the nose of the aircraft.

During this same period, the TRE was also developing the new H2S radar for Bomber Command. H2S featured a plan-position indicator (PPI), which produced a map-like 360° two-dimensional display of the ground below the aircraft. The PPI also greatly eased the operator workload for most other radar tasks as well, because they could see the area around the aircraft at a glance instead of having to manually scan back and forth across areas of interest. ASVS soon adopted the PPI as well, using a 9-inch (230 mm) cathode ray tube (CRT) display and a second, range-only display, on a 6-inch (150 mm) CRT.

H2S had been developed for the new four-engine bombers being introduced at that time, while Bomber Command's older designs like the Wellington were being cast off to Coastal Command. The new bombers, like the Handley Page Halifax, had a large ring cut out of the belly of the bomber to mount a gun turret, and the H2S antenna was produced to fit into this ring. The Wellington's version of the turret cut-out was much smaller, so the main conversion required was to shrink the antenna from 36 inches (910 mm) to 28 inches (710 mm) wide. With that exception, the units were similar to the H2S Mark I.

Philip Dee noted that the first flight on Wellington T2968 did not take place until December 1941 and it was not until 13 January 1942 that he noted "ASV saw [the small ship] Titlark at 12 miles". Success led to contracts with Ferranti for production electronics and Metropolitan Vickers (Metrovick) for the scanning antenna system, which would be known as ASV Mark III. Ferranti had a prototype ready by the summer of 1942, although they predicted that the first deliveries would not be ready before the spring of 1943.

=== Testing ASVS ===
T2968 continued tests until 24 February and on 7 March 1942 was sent to RAF Ballykelly in Northern Ireland to carry out competitive tests against other ASV developments. One was the Mark IIA which had a new transmitter that increased broadcast power from 7 to 100 kW. This was found to increase detection range against surfaced submarines to about 14 miles (23 km) and 7 miles (11 km) even when the submarine was semi-submerged, just the conning tower above water. This was about twice the effective range of the original Mark II. However, this also greatly increased the amount of clutter as the returns from waves were similarly magnified. A second unit used a similar high-power transmitter that operated on a 50 cm wavelength rather that 1.5 m but this was shown to have no advantages over the basic Mark II.

In contrast, the ASVS set showed dramatic improvements. Performance against convoys was 40 miles (64 km) when the aircraft was flying at only 500 feet, in spite of the radar horizon being only 27 nautical miles (50 km; 31 mi) at that altitude. Other aircraft were visible at 10 miles (16 km) and surfaced submarines at 12 miles (19 km). The ASVS was immediately chosen as the new operational requirement, with the 50 cm set also being ordered as a backup. As it became clear the magnetron was going to work, the 50 cm system was cancelled.

=== H2S, new Mark III ===
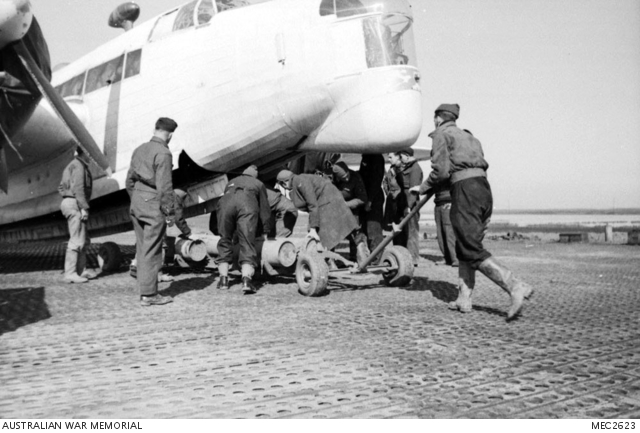
The Mark III's small antenna allowed it to be mounted in a much smaller fairing than H2S. Here it is seen under the nose of a Wellington of No. 458 Squadron RAAF.

Robert Hanbury Brown was convinced the H2S radar being developed for RAF Bomber Command could be adapted for anti-shipping work, simply by changing the antenna to one suited to an aircraft flying at 2,000 feet (610 m) rather than 20,000 feet (6,100 m). He continued working on this project with the primary developers of H2S, EMI.

By late 1942, Metox had been introduced and Ferranti reported that the Mark III would not be available in numbers for some time. Brown's H2S-based adaptation was largely complete and it would be possible to have a small number of hand-built units installed by the end of 1942. This system, working at 10 cm, would be invisible to Metox. The TRE team in charge of ASVS was not under the control of Dee, so he was happy to point out problems with their design. On 25 September 1942, at a meeting at the DCD, Dee noted that the AI and ASV teams were developing separate systems that were, from a signals perspective, almost identical. The only major difference was that ASV had larger displays. He proposed abandoning the Ferranti system and using the H2S-based system.

The meeting took place during a furious debate over the use of the magnetron; if an aircraft carrying H2S was shot down, it would fall into German hands and be quickly reverse engineered. Frederick Lindemann was especially vocal against the use of the magnetron in H2S and demanded they use a klystron instead. The klystron was already known to the Germans and so fragile that it would be unlikely to survive any crash. A similar concern did not exist for ASV, where the magnetron would fall into the water if shot down. This made ASV a much safer choice for deployment of the very few magnetron units available. The commander of Bomber Command, Arthur "Bomber" Harris, objected, claiming his bombers would do much more damage to the German U-boat fleet by bombing their pens in France than Coastal Command would by hunting them down at sea. The meeting ended with Coastal Command being awarded priority for the magnetron-based units. On 30 September, Ferranti was ordered to stop work on their design in favour of the H2S-based system, also to be known as Mark III.

The higher echelons of Coastal Command complained, as the Air Ministry had cancelled the original Mark III without consulting them; the immediate availability seemed not to impress them. These complaints led to further friction between them and Bomber Command. Adding to the confusion, the commander of Coastal Command, Philip Joubert de la Ferté, visited the radar development teams at the TRE and told them he did not believe in ASV, which led to demands to see it in action. More confusion followed when the TRE teams suggested fitting the new radar on four-engine airframes. These would provide ample room for the installations and superb range over the North Atlantic. On 8 December 1942, a meeting was called over the topic but Joubert refused to intercede in favour of the TRE and they were told to continue with the two-engine Wellington.

== In service ==
=== Initial flights ===
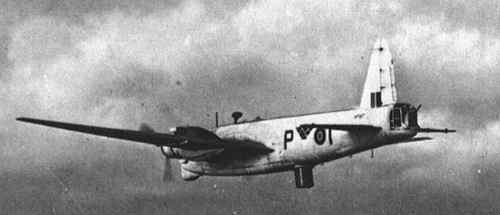
On the Wellington, the unused ventral turret ring was used to mount a retractable version of the Leigh Light that lowered drag during cruise.

The use of the Wellington with ASV Mark III coincided with the move of the Leigh Light from the wing of the aircraft to a retractable "dustbin" arrangement that extended down through the former belly gun turret ring. This meant the radar scanner could not be placed in that location, as it was on H2S aircraft. The radome was instead moved to the nose. This blocked scanning to the rear, about 40 degrees on either side of the fuselage, and meant the nose guns had to be removed; the nose gunner typically fired on the U-boats to suppress their anti-aircraft gunners and losing this capability was unpopular.

By the end of the year, a small number of units were available and in December 1942 two were sent to No. 30 Maintenance Unit for fitting to Wellington VIIIs, which began testing at the Coastal Command Development Unit in January. There was little difference between the H2S and ASV except for the name. Both included two CRTs displays, a 6" tube for the main scanner display and a smaller 3" "height scope" below it. The latter was used to measure altitude and for use with Eureka radio beacons and in ASV, it also became used as a timing system for the illumination of the Leigh Light.

The priority given to Coastal Command was short-lived and on 8 January 1943, priority reverted to Bomber Command. It became clear that there were not enough fitters to keep the units working and in addition to local recruits, a class from the recently formed RAF Station Clinton in Ontario, Canada sent another 110 technicians. The technicians first had a short stay in the US to train on the similar US-designed DMS-1000.

The first operational patrol using one of the two aircraft was carried out on the night of 1/2 March 1943. The aircraft returned from Biscay without having spotted submarines. During the patrol, the aircraft was attacked by German night fighters and the radar operator was able to give the pilot instructions to evade them. Similar patrols also returned empty-handed until the night of 17 March, when H538 spotted a submarine at 9 miles (14 km) but their Leigh Light failed and they could not press the attack. The next night the same aircraft spotted a submarine at 7 miles (11 km) and depth charged it. Supplies of the magnetron began to improve at the start of March 1943 and on 12 March it was decided to split the deliveries equally between the two commands. A serious limitation of spare parts then became a problem but was eventually solved by sending more spares to Bomber Command, to make up for their higher loss rates.

=== Into service ===
Enough units arrived by the end of March for No. 172 Squadron RAF at RAF Chivenor to convert their Wellington XIIs to the Mark III. The squadron was soon pressing attacks every week and in April the number of sightings in the Bay shot up. Calculations demonstrated that the aircraft were at least sighting every submarine in service at that time. Around the time of the introduction of Mark III, the first similar US radar units were arriving, built using magnetron technology introduced to them during the Tizard Mission in late 1940. These DMS-1000s were mounted on the Consolidated B-24 Liberator, one of the very few aircraft with enough range to enable it to fly patrols over the Mid-Atlantic gap and thereby allow aircraft to provide cover over convoys all the way from Halifax to ports in the UK. A B-24 with DMS-1000 was sent to the UK in January 1942 and used operationally by No. 224 Squadron RAF, where the system was referred to as the ASV Mark IV.

For reasons unknown, the US Army Air Corps decided to cancel development of the DMS-1000 in favour of the Western Electric SCR-517, although it proved to be far less sensitive. The RAF learned of another unit intended for mounting in US Coast Guard blimps, the Philco ASG, that was comparable to the original DMS-1000. They asked that the ASG be used on their Liberator order instead, referring to it as ASV Mark V. In March, a shipment of Liberators with a mix of DMS-1000, SCR-517 and ASG arrived and were put into service in June. These aircraft lacked the Leigh Light and were generally unable to press the attack but they were invaluable for upsetting the U-boats' approach and calling in ships to attack them.

=== The tide turns ===
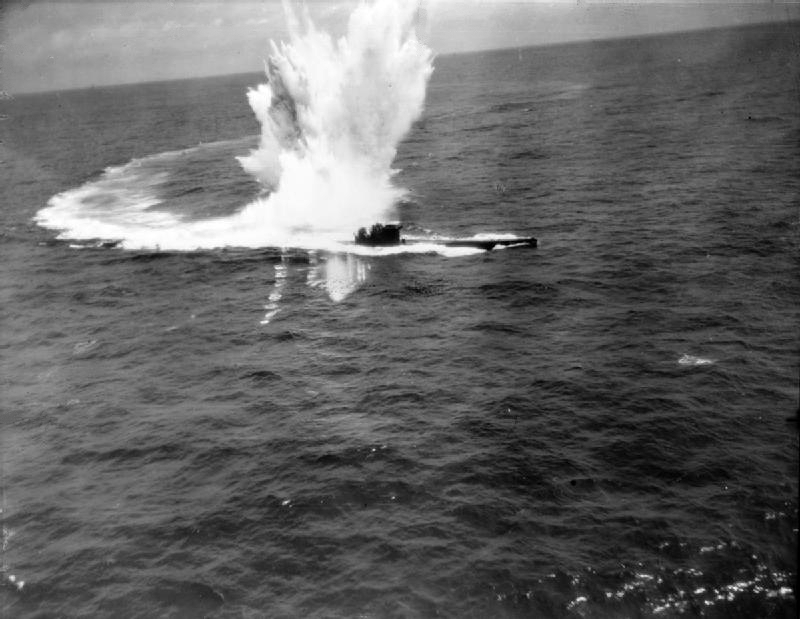
Mk. III-equipped Sunderland W4030 of No. 10 Squadron RAAF attacks U-243 in the Bay of Biscay in the summer of 1944.

By May, the U-boats were subjected to attacks from the time they entered the Bay of Biscay to time they returned. Even if they escaped into the Atlantic, boats were being attacked hundreds of miles from the convoys while they tried to assemble in wolfpacks. This was combined with the arrival of new frigates mounting microwave radars and huff-duff receivers, further hindering U-boat operations; attacking convoys proved almost impossible.

Karl Dönitz was convinced this was due to a new detection system but remained baffled to its nature. In a mid-May 1943 report to Hitler, he stated:

We are at present facing the greatest crisis in submarine warfare, since the enemy, by means of location devices makes fighting impossible and is causing us heavy losses.

Attempting to address the continual attacks in the Bay of Biscay, Dönitz ordered the U-boats to leave port during the day when they could attempt to shoot down the aircraft and day fighter cover could be provided. Coastal Command responded by forming up "Strike Wings" using high-speed aircraft like the Bristol Beaufighter which travelled in small packs and made hit-and-run attacks, overwhelming the U-boats' defences while also proving difficult for the German fighters to attack as they made one run and then disappeared at high speed. While the U-boats did manage to shoot down several aircraft, the losses of boats continued to climb.

In June, U-boats were seen leaving port in flotillas of five or more, providing a higher density of anti-aircraft fire to the point where it was dangerous to approach them, while also reducing the chance of detection per boat. (Note: This is the basic reason for using convoys, it is easily demonstrated that one large group is much less likely to be detected than the same number of boats travelling separately. This is not true for radar detection as one large target is easier to detect than individual small ones. For many radars a convoy will appear to be one larger target. Whether the convoys helped or hindered detection my Mark III is not mentioned in the sources.) The RAF responded by having the aircraft stand off from the U-boats and call in destroyers, who could sink them with ease. If the U-boats attempted to dive, the aircraft would pounce. For the boats that managed to evade attack in the Bay, operations against the convoys were proving almost impossible. Every attempt to form up was disrupted long before the convoys approached, sometimes hundreds of miles away, when hunter-killer groups tracked them down. Shipping losses to the U-boats plummeted; in June less shipping was lost than any time since 1941. By the end of the month, 30 per cent of the U-boat force at sea had been lost, a catastrophe. Dönitz was forced to recall the fleet from the North Atlantic, sending them to secondary theatres while some sort of solution was developed.

=== British lie, German confusion ===
In late February 1943, German submarine U-333 was attacked by a Mk. III-equipped Wellington. The gunners were already on high alert and managed to shoot the aircraft down, but as it fell it managed to drop charges around the boat. The submarine survived and reported that the Metox gave no warning of the approach and the Leigh Light was not used. The aircraft simply appeared out of the murk and dropped a string of depth charges. On 7 March, U-156 was attacked in a similar fashion, and radioed in that they believed a new radar was being used.

Despite this early warning of a new system, German efforts were hampered by one of the most effective bits of misinformation of the war. A Coastal Command captain who had been captured after crashing told a plausible story, apparently entirely of his own creation, that threw the Germans off the scent for months. He stated that they no longer used Mk. II for the initial detection, and instead used a new receiver that listened for the slight leakage of the intermediate frequency used in the Metox's tuner. He claimed that it could detect the Metox at ranges as great as 90 miles (140 km). The radar was now only turned on during the last minutes of the approach to check the range and aid the Leigh Light operation.

At first, the Germans were skeptical of this claim, but a series of experiments in the lab soon demonstrated this was indeed possible. The equipment was then installed in an aircraft and demonstrated its ability to detect a Metox at a distance of 70 miles (110 km) while flying at 6,000 feet (1,800 m) altitude. The extra 20 miles (32 km) originally claimed was attributed to the UK's superiority in electronics.

From that point, the false information was "treated as gospel", in spite of much evidence to the contrary. This included reports from boats that were attacked while their Metox was turned off, and one report from an enterprising radio operator in U-382 who had been experimenting with a visual display with the Metox and detected signals that were well outside the normal range. In spite of these reports, on 15 August 1943 a radio message was sent to the entire fleet telling them to turn off their Metox.

The most surprising aspect of this confusion was that the Germans were aware of the magnetron and that it was being used for new high-frequency radars. An intact example had fallen into German hands during its second operational use when a Short Stirling carrying H2S was shot down over Rotterdam on the night of 2/3 February 1943. For reasons unknown, the possibility of this system being used for anti-submarine work either never reached the Navy or was dismissed as impossible by Navy engineers.

=== German countermeasures ===
Believing the issue was leakage from Metox, boats returning to port were fit with the Wanze radar detector that was originally designed to detect signals in the 120 to 150 cm range but due to its new design also had lower signal leakage and greater sensitivity and range. Despite Wanze, U-boat sinkings continued and on 5 November 1943, the use of Wanze was prohibited as well, as they believed it too might be tracked. A new version, Wanze G2, reduced signal leakage even more at the cost of shorter range and produced no improvement. Borkum was introduced in the summer of 1943. Borkum was much less sensitive than Wanze but further reduced leakage to the point that command felt it was safe to use under any circumstance. Sensitive between 75 and 300 cm Borkum was still outside the range where it might detect the Mk. III. The sinkings continued unabated.

Only in September 1943 did the German navy consider the possibility of 10 cm signals. At that time the Luftwaffe was introducing the Naxos radar detector to allow their night fighters to track H2S radars. The receiver was adapted to a new antenna and introduced that month. Naxos offered very short-range detection, on the order of 8 kilometres (5 mi), so even if it detected the Mk. III, it offered very little time to dive to safety. Further, the Naxos antenna was a fragile device and had to be removed to dive; the commander of U-625 drowned while he struggled to remove the antenna.

Several improvements to the Naxos were introduced during 1944, notably the new Fliege antenna that did not have to be removed to dive. Fliege offered not only reception but also reasonable directivity, allowing it to provide initial aiming for the anti-aircraft guns. A further improved antenna, Mücke, added antennas to detect 3 cm signals when an H2S unit working on the frequency had been recovered from an RAF bomber. Coastal Command never moved to this frequency on any large scale. Further efforts to understand the British radars led to missions with highly instrumented submarines, U-406 and U-473, both of which were sunk. Naxos was never a convincing solution to the Mark III problem.

== Improved versions ==
=== IIIA ===
Shortly after the first IIIs arrived, a minor improvement was added, producing the Mark IIIA, or ARI.5153. Although there were a number of minor differences in the equipment, the main difference was the addition of the Lucero system. Lucero was a transceiver tuned to the 1.5 m band radio beacons and transponders used for navigation and IFF Mark III. Lucero's 500 W transmitter periodically sent out signals near 176 MHz, or could be switched to the Blind Approach Beacon System (BABS) at 173.5 MHz. When these signals were received by ground-based transponders, the transponder would reply with a short pulse of its own, typically with much greater power. This pulse was picked up by the Lucero receiver, amplified, and sent to the ASV or H2S height scope. Two antennas were used and a motorized switch alternated the receiver between them every 4 or 5 signals, to produce lobe switching. The switch also turned on a signal inverter on the height scope so that signals from the left-side antenna caused deflection to the left, instead of the normal right side. The result was two "blips" on the height scope; by comparing their amplitude, the radar operator could determine the direction of the beacon relative to the nose of the aircraft.

Lucero was used to provide very long-range navigation back to home airfields. While returning from a mission, the radar operator would turn on the Lucero unit and could pick up the responses from the airfields while still as much as half an hour away. As the number of beacons proliferated, a significant problem with spectrum overcrowding emerged. This led to the movement of the Rebecca/Eureka system to the 214 to 234 MHz band, which in turn led to new versions of Lucero that could be used with this system.

=== IIIB ===
By the end of 1943, substantial improvements had been made to H2S and were entering production, including more efficient antenna designs, the use of waveguides instead of coaxial cables which improved the signal strength, roll stabilization to keep the image steady while the aircraft maneuvered, a "north-up" display and height-corrected displays that showed ground distance instead of slant range. All of these were of little interest in the ASV role, especially the ground-range modifications which were not necessary - due to the low altitudes being flown by these aircraft, the slant range was not too different than the ground distance.

As Coastal Command did not need these improvements, H2S and ASV became two separate lines with the introduction of the first custom ASV system, Mark IIIB. For this version, a new control allowed the operator to expand the "zero ring" as the aircraft approached the target, keeping the target blip near the outside edge of the display instead of it naturally approaching the centre of the display. This kept the blip larger on the display which improved the angular resolution from ~6° to about 1.7° within the last 1,000 feet (300 m) of the approach. Other changes were minor; before the introduction of the height-range adjustments on the newer H2S, this adjustment was carried out with a simple mechanical calculator called the "height drum". As this was not needed for ASV, the range lines used for this calculation were removed from the drum and replaced by a line with fixed steps indicating 1 mile (1.6 km) ranges that could be used with BABS without having to look over at the drum to estimate the range to the airfield. The "strobe", a small blip created by the range drum system that was displayed on the height scope, was no longer adjustable and instead fixed at 1 mile range, used to time the use of the Leigh Light.

=== IIIC ===
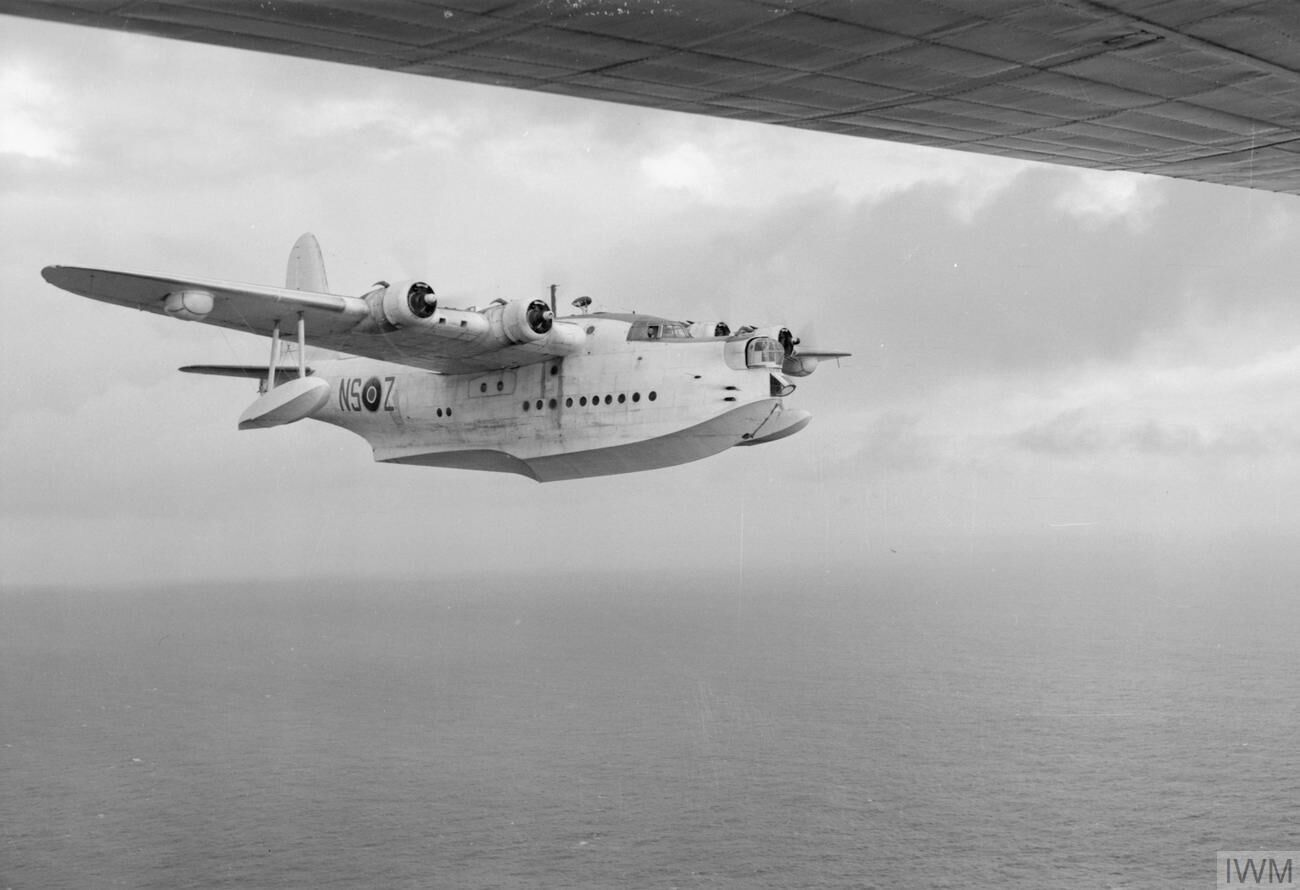
The well-faired radomes of the Mark IIIC produced less drag than the large antenna sets of the Mark II.

By 1943 the Short Sunderland flying boat was a major part of the Coastal Command fleet. These had been using ASV Mark II, whose antennas were mounted under the wings or on either side of the fuselage. Mark III presented a problem as the nose and belly locations that gave the required all-round view could not be used due to the boat hull of the aircraft. This led to a modified version known as Mark IIIC. IIIC used two scanners, one under the outer section of each wing. Their rotation was synchronized to one drive and the radio signal switched between them during the rotation. To maintain coverage in the important dead-ahead area, the signal did not switch to the port-side (left) scanner until 15° past dead-ahead, so the starboard-side (right) scanner covered 195°, not 180. The signal was provided by a magnetron, piped to the scanners via a waveguide run through the leading edge of the Sunderland's massive wing. In tests carried out in April 1944, the IIIC demonstrated greatly improved performance over the Mk. IIIs in Wellington and Halifax, as much as double, although the reasons were never fully determined.

=== Sea return discriminator ===
Large waves have vertical sides that reflect radar efficiently, and this causes false returns on the display. In high sea states this can fill the display with noise, rendering the system useless. This led to experiments with a "sea return discriminator" to help filter these out. The discriminator was a high pass filter that muted any low-frequency components of the signal as it exited the amplifiers. This caused a -3 dB reduction in signal below about 40 kHz. In experiments in March 1944, it was reported that the system eliminated wave clutter in medium sea states and greatly reduced it in high states. Although it also reduced the signal returned from targets, a good operator could adjust the set so it was not adversely affected for tracking.

== Replacement ==
When Metox was first introduced, the TRE responded with several concepts to defeat it. Among these was ASV Mark IIA, a more powerful version of the original Mk. II which also included an attenuator known as "Vixen". The radar operator would use Vixen to progressively mute the transmission signals as they approached the submarine, making it appear the aircraft was simply flying by at some distance. The second idea was to move to a new frequency, which became the Mk. III. In testing in January 1942, Mark III proved superior and Mk. IIA was dropped.

When Mark III was being introduced, its developers at the TRE felt the Germans would quickly extend the frequency response of Metox to see the new signals and the cycle would repeat. To anticipate the Germans, several developments began to introduce new models that could be ready to enter service as soon as it became evident this was occurring. As with Mark II, they considered two possible solutions, a more powerful version of Mark III with an attenuator, and the move to a new frequency. These emerged as Mark VI and Mark VII.

It was not until October 1943 that RAF crews began noticing the return of the "disappearing contacts" problem, which was due to the introduction of Naxos. Given this unexpected delay in countering Mark III, both models were well advanced but only in February 1944 was Mark VI first installed on the Wellingtons. Even then, Naxos was never as effective as Metox and in spite of a few instances of Naxos-aided U-boat escapes, these were the exception and Mark III remained the most widely used system until the end of the war.

=== Mark VI ===
Two types of attenuator were introduced for the Mark VI effort. Type 53 consisted of two wire rings, each 1/4 wavelengths long on either side of the waveguide between the magnetron and the antenna. When the rings were rotated parallel to the waveguide, they did not see the signal and did nothing to the propagation. When they were rotated perpendicular to the waveguide, they began to resonate and gave off a signal that, due to Lenz's law, opposed the original signal, muting it. These loops also attenuated the received signal and this was the reason for the move to the 200 kW CV192 magnetron, compared to the original 40 kW version. An improved attenuator, Type 58, added a Sutton tube to the loops, so that they could be switched out of the circuit entirely during the receiver period, allowing the full signal to reach the receiver. With the added power of the new magnetron, units with the Type 58 had significantly improved range over the original Mk III.

A further improvement was the addition of a lock-follow system. It was found that the operators had difficulty reading the extended blips on the display and turning that into an accurate angle to guide the aircraft. The Mark VIA added a lobe switching system with two closely spaced antennas that could measure the slight difference in signals strength between the two and use that to directly guide the motors turning the antenna. Once turned on, the system automatically followed the target with an accuracy far better than the human operators. The system proved troublesome and it was not available until the U-boat bases in Biscay had been abandoned following D-Day.

=== Mark VII ===
The other solution to the potential microwave radar detector was to move to a new frequency. This was becoming possible in 1943 as the first magnetrons operating in the 3 cm X-band became available. These were already being tested for X band H2S. Moving to 3 cm band offered another tremendous advantage. The optical resolution of a radar system varies with the antenna aperture and inversely with the wavelength. In the case of ASV, the 28 inches (710 mm) antenna produced a beam that was about 10° wide, although it was most sensitive near the centre. The signal from a submarine was returned when it was anywhere within the centre section, perhaps 5° on either side. The resulting blip was not a distinct dot on the display, but a 10° wide or greater arc. The operator knew the submarine was near the centre of the arc but other large objects at the same range would also produce similar arcs and these might overlap that of the target. At long range, these could be miles on either side and in medium to high sea states, large waves near the submarine would obscure its return. Moving to 3 cm improved the beam width to about 3° and made the arcs much shorter. Only waves much closer could obscure the submarine, greatly increasing the level of sea state that the radar remained effective. The advantages of X-band were obvious but Bomber Command was planning on using the same magnetrons. It seemed likely that Coastal Command would once again lose the argument over the supply for UK-built units. Mk. VII was not ordered into production, in favour of similar X-band units that would soon be available from the US. The small number of units produced during development were instead used for air-sea rescue aircraft, where their higher resolution allowed them to detect small lifeboats.

== Description ==
=== ASV Mark III vs. H2S Mark II ===
The original Mark III was identical to the H2S Mark II, except for the antenna system. H2S used a 36 inches (910 mm) reflector designed to spread the signal out in a wide vertical angle to illuminate the area below the bomber as well as in front of it. The system for ASV modified the design, reducing its width to 28 inches to fit under the nose of the Wellington and reshaping it to send less energy downward. As the aircraft would be flying at low altitude, the area under the bomber was relatively small and did not need to be covered. Another change was to replace the H2S's coaxial cable power feed with a cable that ran to the scanner unit, and then switched to waveguide and feedhorn on the antenna. This modification was later applied to H2S Mark IIA. The IIIC installations on the Sunderland had separate and non-interchangeable antennas, Type 12 and 53. They were fed via a waveguide running through the wing, connected to a magnetron in the fuselage. This was combined with Switch Unit 205, which sent the magnetron output alternately to the two scanners as they rotated. The Type 205 consisted of a muting unit similar to the Vixen system, which alternately muted one output and then the other as the loops were rotated.

=== Physical layout ===
The ASV/H2S system consisted of four main components among eleven packages. At the heart of the system was the Waveform Generator Type 26, which was also known more generally as the modulator. This acted as a master clock for the system, triggering the output of the magnetron, switching the system from transmit to receive, starting the trace on the CRT display and other tasks. The modulator was connected directly to several of the main components and even through a Junction Box. The radar signal was generated by the 40 kW peak CV64 magnetron that was part of the Transmitter/Receiver unit, TR.3159 or TR.3191 depending on the version. This fed a signal to the antenna as well as a CV67 klystron. Magnetrons produce slightly different output with every pulse, which makes it difficult to build a receiver that can match this varying signal. The CV67 picked up some of the output pulse and began to resonate at that frequency, providing a steady reference signal for the receiver.

The Transmitter/Receiver was also responsible for the first part of the receiver system. A CV43 Sutton tube switched the antenna from the transmitter to receiver side of the system after the pulses were sent. From there it was modulated by a CV101 diode, one of the earliest examples of military-grade solid state electronics and a key element of microwave radars. After the diode, the signal had been reduced in frequency from ~3,300 MHz to a 13.5 MHz intermediate frequency that was then fed back through the aircraft in a coaxial cable to the receiver/amplifier. The Receiver, T.3515 or T.3516, took the 13.5 MHz intermediate frequency and amplified it to usable levels. The output was sent to the Indicating unit Type 162, which contained the two CRTs. If it was equipped, the Lucero receiver, TR.3190, was connected to the height display, sitting (electrically) between the receiver and display. Which of these circuits was in use, along with many other controls, was located on the Switch Unit. This also required the use of the Control Unit 411, which timed and powered the scanning system.

=== Displays and interpretation ===
The main display on the Mark III was a 6 inches (150 mm) CRT. When the Waveform Generator fired, it triggered a time base generator that pulled the electron beam outward from the centre of the display to the outer edge in the same time as the maximum return from the radar at the current range setting. When the system was set to its typical 30 miles (48 km) range, the radar signals would take 30 miles / 186,282 miles per second = 0.00016 seconds to travel 30 miles and the same to travel back. At this setting, the timebase pulled the beam across the face in 0.00032 seconds or 320 microseconds. The system could be set to scan at 10, 30 or 50 miles and had a separate mode for long-range Lucero use that displayed signals in the 50 to 100 miles (80 to 161 km) range. A second system rotated the CRT's deflection yoke, synchronised with the scanner using a magslip. This meant that the line being drawn by the time base was rotating around the screen. When a target returned a signal, it would brighten up the beam. By adjusting the brightness of the display, the operator could set it up so that targets appeared as bright patches while the rest of the signal was muted so that it was invisible. The operator had continually to adjust the system so that it was not muting too much and making real returns invisible as well.

Because the antenna had about a 10° beamwidth, the target did not appear as a single spot on the display, but an extended arc. This was, in theory, over 10° wide as the return might be seen when the antenna was on either side of it, but in practice, the arc tended to be perhaps half that as the signal strength on the edges of the beam was lower. This did not effect the accuracy of the system during the initial approach as the U-boat was somewhere near the middle of the arc, and when it was near the outside of the display this might be an inch wide and the operator could easily pinpoint the approximate centre. However, as the aircraft approached the target the return moved towards the centre of the display where it became progressively smaller, making it increasingly difficult to estimate the centre. It was estimated that the average accuracy in heading at close range was only 6°. In later versions this could be addressed by adjusting the unit to push nearby returns out to the edges of the display, using a control originally intended to do the reverse in H2S settings.

The display also had controls on the switch box to display a "strobe" at a fixed delay. This caused a spot to appear a certain time after the trace began, and as the display rotated, this created a circle on the display. This was used by the operator to make accurate measurements of the range to a selected target, which was displayed on the switch box by rotating the Range Drum. Like H2S, the ASV displays also had the option to display a solid line extending from the middle to the edge that represented the flight path of the aircraft. In H2S use, this feature was used because a second system rotated the entire display so that north was always up, like a map, so it was useful to have a way to see the flight path on the display. Coastal Command aircraft lacked this system, likely due to a shortage of Distant Reading compasses that fed this information to the display. This heading-indication line was typically not used in ASV, and the associated Control Unit Type 218 was not carried. There was a secondary 2.5 inches (64 mm) CRT known as the Height Tube. This lacked the system to rotate the display with the antenna, and always drew a line vertically up the display. Receiver signals did not cause the beam to brighten, but instead deflect to the right, causing a blip to appear. A strobe like the one on the PPI could be moved along this display.

As the name implies, the main purpose of the Height Tube was to measure altitude. The H2S operator would move the strobe onto the first major blip on the display, which was caused by signals reflecting off the ground and being picked up in the antenna's sidelobes. This was not as useful in the ASV role, where the low-altitude flights made it easy to measure altitude visually. In ASV, the Height Tube was used primarily with Lucero for beacon tracking. The separate Switch Unit Type 207 contained most of the controls for range and mode selection. It also included the Range Drum, a simple mechanical calculator. This was the location of the mechanical displays for the range and height strobes, the range being indicated by rotating the drum and the height as an arrow-shaped pointer moving up and down the left side of the display. A radar measures the slant range to a target, not its distance measured over the ground. By reading a series of lines on the Height Drum where one of the lines intersected the tip of the height arrow, the operator could read off the ground distance to the target. This feature was of little use in the ASV role, where low altitude flying meant the slant range was similar to the ground range and was later modified to be used primarily with the BABS system.

=== Lucero ===
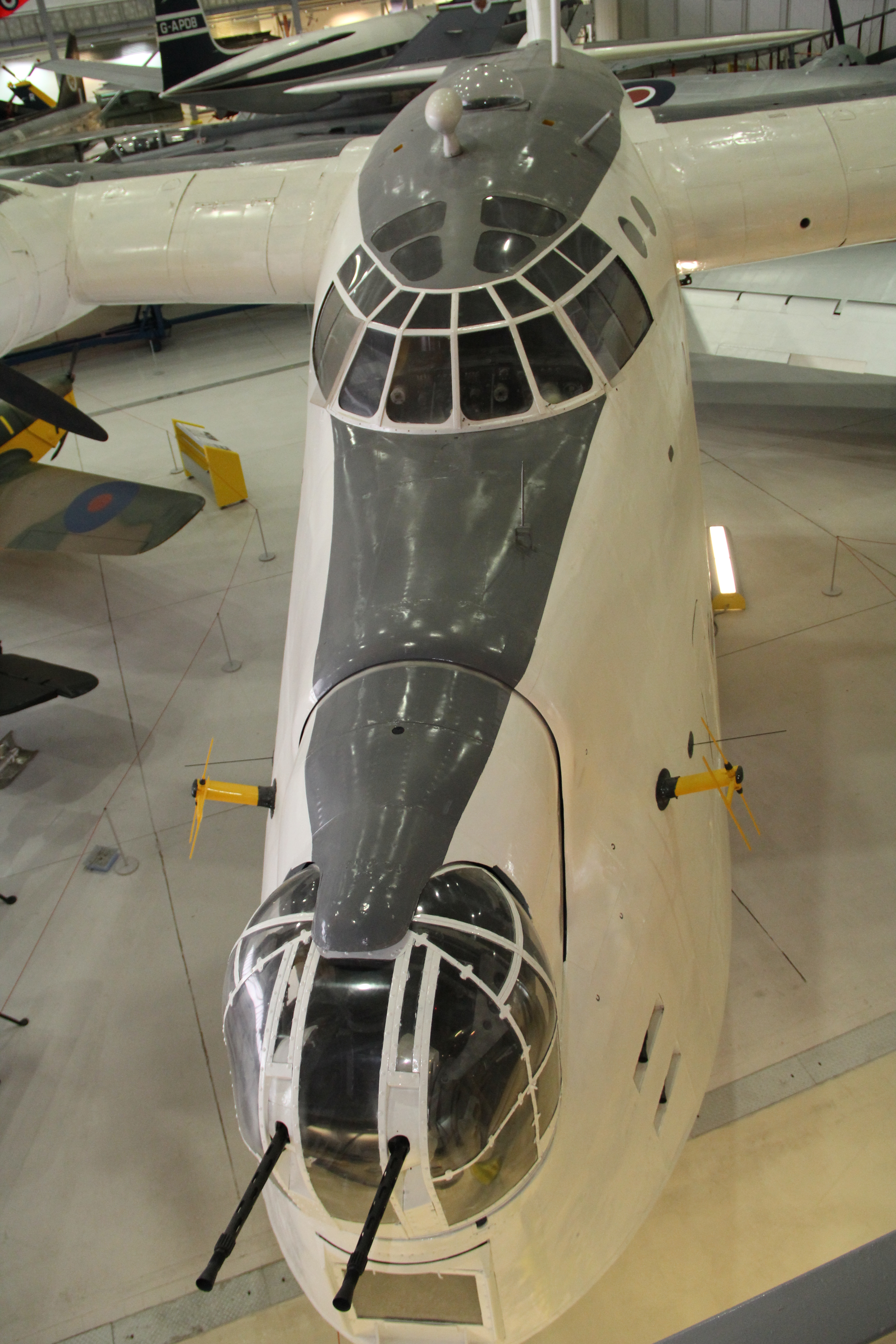
Imperial War Museum Duxford's Sunderland V has bright-yellow Lucero receiver antennas on either side of the nose.

When the Switch Box selected Lucero, the height display was switched off the main signal and connected to the Lucero antennas. There were two receiver antennas, one on either side of the aircraft. A motorised switch rapidly selected between the two antennas. One of the two was also sent through an electrical inverter. When amplified and sent to the display, this caused two blips to appear, one on either side of the vertical baseline. The longer blip was more closely aligned with the transponder on the ground, so by turning toward the longer blip one could navigate the aircraft towards it.

== Performance ==
The performance of Coastal Command operations was a significant area of operational research throughout the war and the Mark III was repeatedly tested both in its own performance as well as relative measures against other radar systems. In its first notable test series, a prototype Mark III was test flown against the high-power Mk. IIA and an experimental system working at 50 cm. The Mk. IIA demonstrated reliable detection a fully surfaced submarine at 14 miles (23 km) at 1500 ft, 11 miles (18 km) at 1,000 ft and 7 miles (11 km) at 500 ft. Against a submarine trimmed down so the deck was closer to the waterline, the ranges were 7 miles at 1,500 feet, 6 miles at 1,000 feet and 4 miles (6.4 km) at 500 feet. Minimum ranges varied from three miles to one mile.

The prototype Mark III, referred to as 10 cm ASV in the report, turned in much better results. Reliable maximum ranges against a fully surfaced submarine were 12 miles at 500 feet and 10 miles at 250 feet, about 50% better than the Mk. IIA. Large convoys could be detected at ranges of up to 40 miles (64 km) while flying at an altitude of 500 feet, which meant the ships were well below the radar horizon and the aircraft was invisible to them. Other aircraft could be reliably seen at a range of 10 miles (16 km) and the operator could make some estimate about their direction of travel. These tests convinced Coastal Command to choose Mark III as their primary system.

In November 1944, similar comparisons were carried out between Mark III and Mark VI and then compared to earlier tests of the Mark VII from that August. Using Grassholm Island off the coast of Wales as a target, Mk. III provided an average detection distance of 23.5 miles (37.8 km), while Mk. VI's more powerful signals improved this significantly to 38.5 miles (62.0 km) and the Mk. VII's weaker 25 kW demonstrated a maximum around 35 miles (56 km). Mk. III was estimated to detect a U-boat from the side at 22 miles (35 km), improving to 32 miles (51 km) for Mk. VI and as low as 18 miles (29 km) for Mk. VII. The range against end-on targets was 10.5 miles (16.9 km), 20.5 miles (33.0 km) and 10 miles (16 km), respectively.
