= Mid-Atlantic gap =

Area outside airplane range in World War II

The Mid-Atlantic gap (1941) was an area outside the cover by land-based aircraft; those limits are shown with black arcs. Blue dots show destroyed ships of the Allies

The Mid-Atlantic gap is a geographical term applied to an undefended area of the Atlantic Ocean during the Battle of the Atlantic in the Second World War. The region was beyond the reach of land-based RAF Coastal Command anti-submarine warfare (ASW) aircraft. This resulted in many merchant shipping losses to U-boats. The gap was eventually closed in May 1943, as growing numbers of Very Long Range Liberators (VLR) and escort carriers became available and as basing problems were solved.

== History ==
RAF Coastal Command was assigned responsibility for anti-submarine warfare (A/S or ASW) patrols when it was created in 1936. It was equipped only with small numbers of short-ranged aircraft, the most common being the Anson (which was obsolete by the start of the Second World War) and Vildebeest (which was obsolete) for a time, shortages of aircraft were so severe, "scarecrow patrols" using Tiger Moths were employed. RAF Bomber Command routinely got higher priority for the best, longest-ranged aircraft. Only as Bomber Command converted to four-engined aircraft did Coastal Command receive the cast-offs, such as Wellington medium bombers, which had adequate range for ASW patrols. Coastal Command's motley of Ansons, Whitleys and Hampden medium bombers were unable to carry the standard 450 lb (200 kg) depth charge; that needed Wellingtons or Short Sunderland flying boats. The other aircraft capable of carrying it, the Lancaster, entering service in early 1942 was Bomber Command's crown jewel and jealously guarded.

Coastal Command's prize was the American-built Liberator GR.I, commonly called the Very Long Range (VLR) Liberator or just VLR. The Liberator B.I proved too vulnerable for bombing over Europe but had excellent range and payload, ideal for ASW. Priority for these went to the U.S. Navy for reconnaissance operations in the Pacific, where their long range were equally valuable, but where they generally carried out operations of lower priority than those of Coastal Command.

VLRs were of particular importance in times when cryptographers at Bletchley Park was unable to read Kriegsmarine Enigma machine ciphers (from which intelligence known as Ultra was derived). When Convoy ON 127 was attacked by the U-boat U-584 on 11 September 1942, there was a VLR of 120 Squadron overhead. Fifteen U-boats converged on Convoy ON 131, only to meet aircraft and Coastal Command sank two, while in protecting Convoy ON 136, the 120 Squadron VLRs sank U-597 on 12 October 1942. Even then, VLRs proved invaluable in co-operation with ship-borne high-frequency direction finding (HF/DF). Defending Convoy SC 104, VLRs guided by HF/DF drove off three shadowing U-boats on 16 October. They bettered the performance on 29 October, for Convoy HX 212, driving off five and then seven on 6 November around Convoy SC 107. "...[T]he apparent inadequacy Newfoundland-based air support was highlighted by the early interception of Convoy SC 107 and the resultant bitter and costly battle." This led RAF belatedly to move a number of Coastal Command squadrons.

The nine Liberator GR.Is of 120 Squadron based in Iceland operating over the Atlantic, were a worry to Admiral Karl Dönitz, Befehlshaber der U-Boote (BdU). As a measure of how valuable they were, after patrols off Canada were added in 1942, only one ship was lost in convoy. Even in mid-1942, Coastal Command only had two squadrons of Liberators and B-17s and at the first sign of Coastal Command success against U-boats, Arthur Harris sought to have their aircraft diverted to Bomber Command to attack German cities.

After Convoy SC 118, Professor Patrick Blackett, Director of the Admiralty Operational Research Section, made several proposals, including diverting VLRs from Bomber Command to Coastal Command. "Despite the strength of Blackett's case, the Admiralty (not to mention the Air Ministry, Bomber Command, and the Americans) believed for some time yet that it could not afford to reduce the air offensive in the Bay of Biscay or to abandon the bombing of German bases by the RAF." "The number of VLR aircraft operating in the North Atlantic in February [1943] was only 18, and no substantial increase was made until after the crisis of March." Nor were night air patrols, recognized as necessary, initiated until the autumn of 1943.

Bomber Command did not refuse entirely to offer assistance against U-boats. From 14 January to May 1943, they flew 7,000 sorties against the U-boat pens in Lorient, Brest and St. Nazaire, at a cost of 266 aircraft and crews. They accomplished no damage to the pens nor the submarines within them. Coastal Command strength never reached 266 VLRs. Raids against German U-boat building yards had similarly disappointing results.

Aircraft also had an important indirect role by preventing the formation of wolf packs. They limited the places U-boats could attack in safety, and (by reducing the ability of shadowing U-boats to find and track convoys) made shipping harder to find, thereby reducing losses. This also helped the convoy escorts, by enabling them to deal with one U-boat at a time. Despite a willingness of Royal Canadian Air Force aircraft to fly in (perennially bad) conditions off the Grand Banks Coastal Command would never have attempted, U-boats could trail convoys beginning very soon after departure from Halifax. Without air-to-surface-vessel radar (ASV), the almost "perpetual fog of the Grand Banks also allowed pack operations to penetrate within a couple of hundred miles of Newfoundland, while aircraft patrolled harmlessly above", and made visual detection impossible.

A means of detecting surfaced submarines at night—when they were at their most vulnerable, recharging batteries, and felt most safe—was a top priority for Coastal Command. ASV gave it to them. The previous AI.II (Mark 2 Airborne Interception) radar became ASV.II (Air to Surface Vessel Mark 2) fitted in Coastal Command aircraft. Coastal Command priority for it ranked behind RAF Fighter Command's night fighter units. ASV.II's 1½-metre wavelength (actually 1.7 m, 176 MHz), mid-VHF band emissions meant that a submarine was usually lost in sea return before it came in visual range, at around one mile (1.6 km), by which time it was already diving. The Leigh light was developed; it had to overcome Air Ministry indifference, and only entered service in June 1941, it proved very successful. This required a large aircraft, such as the Wellington or Liberator, to carry the generator needed to power the light, and most of Coastal Command's aircraft were incapable of it, nor were Bomber Command inclined to turn over anything better. The Germans developed Metox, which picked up ASV radar pulses before it was able to detect a submarine at all, rendering it useless.

The appearance of H2S three gigahertz-frequency (10 cm) radar changed that, and the combination of H2S (as ASV.III) and Leigh light proved lethal to U-boats. Harris denied Coastal Command any allocation of H2S systems, claiming Bomber Command needed it to find targets, in preference to Gee and Oboe, while arguing Coastal Command might lose it to the Germans. Winston Churchill backed him up. Air Marshal John Slessor, head of Coastal Command, countered Bomber Command also risked having it fall in enemy hands, and having the Germans produce a countermeasure against it, before Coastal Command ever got to use it. In the event, this was what happened. The first ASV.III was fitted to a Coastal Command Wellington at Defford in December 1942, with twelve based at Chivenor by February 1943, while a copy of H2S was lost 2/3 February when a Stirling Pathfinder was shot down over the Netherlands, on only H2S's second operational use. Harris made similar objections to supplying the American 3 cm-wavelength H2X radar units to Coastal Command (which knew it as ASV.IV), again got higher priority, and again saw it fall into German hands, almost exactly a year later, in February 1944.

As Coastal Command predicted, the Germans captured the damaged H2S, which would have been next to impossible from a Coastal Command aircraft shot down at sea and Telefunken produced the Rotterdam Gerät (Rotterdam Device, named after where it was captured). Coastal Command's first ASV.III-equipped patrol took place over the Bay of Biscay on 1 March. ASV.III made its first U-boat contact on the night of 17 March but the Leigh Light failed and the Wellington was unable to press home the attack. The first attack using the system occurred the next night. When ASV.III did enter service, German submariners began to mistakenly believe that British aircraft were homing on emissions from the Metox receiver, which no longer gave warning. German scientists were perfecting the Rotterdam Gerät to create a submersible version for U-boat defense, of the airborne FuG 350 Naxos radar detector for night fighters, the submersible version being the FuMB7 Naxos U. While fragile, Naxos worked but it entered service the same day as the 10 GHz-emissions H2X (which Naxos could not detect) became operational in Coastal Command. Naxos was replaced by FuMB36 Tunis in May 1944 and was supplemented by Stumpf, now called radar absorbent material, under the codename Schornsteinfeger ("Chimneysweep").

Just before the TRIDENT Conference, Admiral Ernest J. King got control of A/S aircraft from the United States Army Air Forces (USAAF), arranging a trade of B-24s for comparable types. This enabled Slessor to "borrow" one squadron. After attacks on Convoy ON 166, the number of VLRs in Newfoundland finally increased. "Canadians had been pressing hard for Liberators since autumn 1942, against British doubts that the RCAF could employ them effectively, while the RCAF, for its part, opposed RAF taking over a job RCAF saw as its own. The commanding officer of 120 Squadron, Squadron Leader Bulloch, confirmed RCAF's ability, and in early March 1943, the number in Newfoundland belatedly increased (though it was not enough to constitute 10 Squadron, RCAF, before 10 May), while 120 Squadron's strength doubled. This still only put all of thirty-eight VLRs over the Mid-Atlantic Gap. The arrival of 25th Antisubmarine Wing, USAAF, with its medium-range B-24s (equipped with H2S, probably built by Canadians), made it possible to free Coastal Command VLRs without it. The growth in numbers of escort carriers meant "a dramatic increase of USAAF Fortresses and medium-range Liberators" could be based in Newfoundland. The 25th Wing flew over the Bay of Biscay, where they sank one U-boat before being redeployed to Morocco.

Increasing availability of escort carriers reduced the hazard of the Gap. After a crisis in March which nearly had Churchill and the Admiralty abandon convoys altogether, the Mid-Atlantic Gap was finally closed in May 1943, when RCAF VLRs became operational in Newfoundland, by which time the Battle of the Atlantic was largely won.

== See also ==
- Mid-Ocean Escort Force
- Mid-Ocean Meeting Point
- GIUK gap
- CAM ship
- MAC ship
- Project Habakkuk
