= Mid-Ocean Meeting Point =

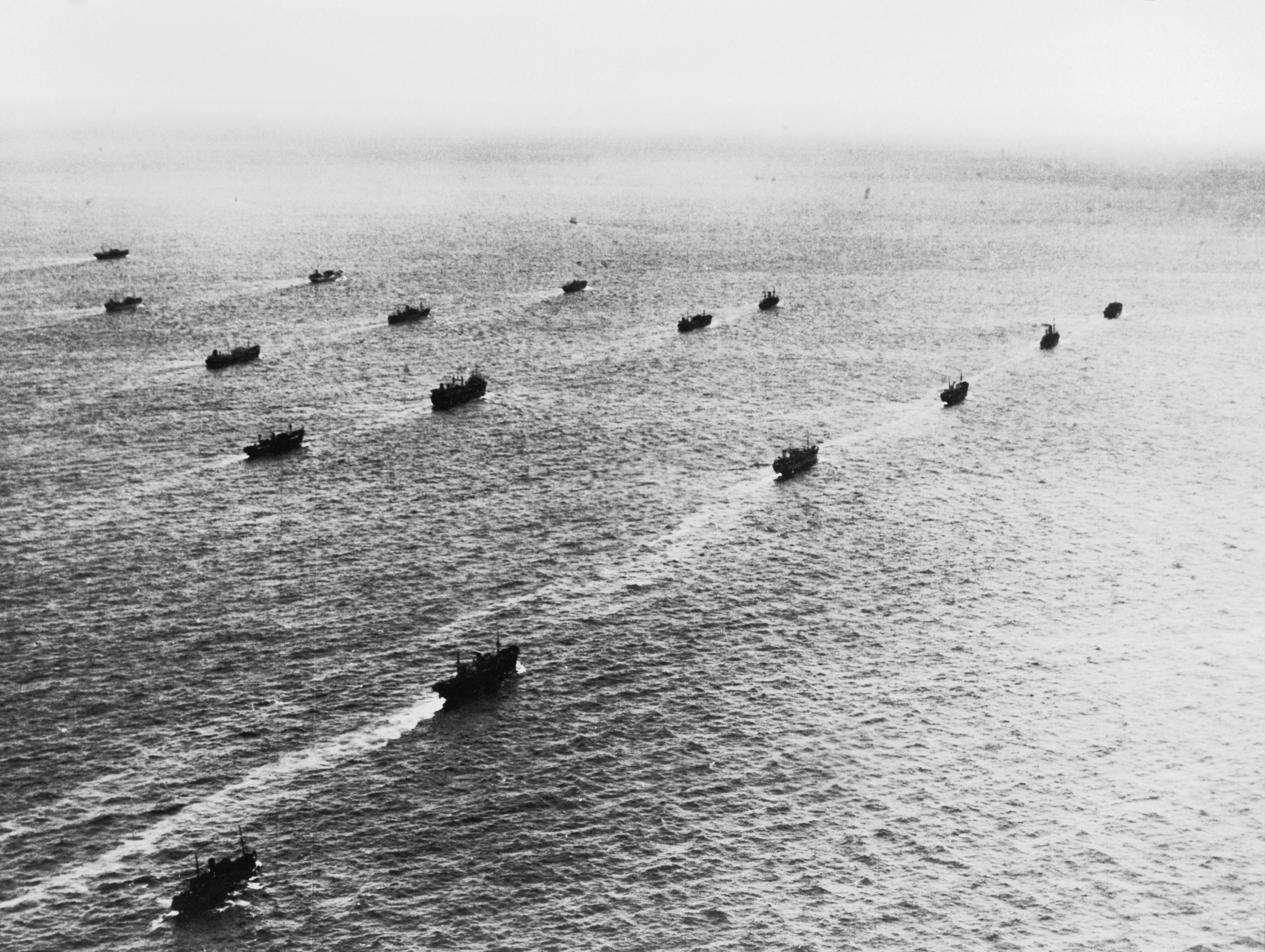
Escorts rendezvoused with convoys like this one at the Mid-Ocean Meeting Point.

The Mid-Ocean Meeting Point (MOMP) was the name of a point south of Iceland where escort groups would meet World War II merchant ship convoys en route between Newfoundland and the British Isles. The actual meeting point might be different for each convoy, but was always north of 58° North and in the vicinity of 35° West.

== Background ==
In the First and Second World Wars merchant ships of the Allies on the Atlantic sailed grouped into convoys to protect them better against enemy attacks. The type of escort depended upon the perceived threat. Anti-submarine escorts initially accompanied convoys only in the vicinity of the British Isles; while a battleship, cruiser, or armed merchant cruiser would accompany the convoy through the central ocean to defend against pocket battleships or merchant raiders.

As Axis submarines patrolled further from coastal Europe, it became difficult for short-range anti-submarine escorts to accompany a convoy through the entire danger zone and advantageous to designate segments of the route for a relay of escorts to accompany the convoy over individual segments. Some segments began or ended close to naval bases where the escorts could easily locate an assigned convoy. Efficient convoy routes sometimes required ocean meeting points more distant from bases.

Royal Canadian Navy assistance allowed trans-Atlantic anti-submarine escort by the end of May 1941. Convoys leaving Nova Scotia were escorted to a western ocean meeting point (WOMP or WESTOMP) off Newfoundland where a second escort group relieved the first escort group. The second escort group accompanied the convoy to the MOMP off Iceland, where a third escort group relieved the second escort group. The third escort group accompanied the convoy to an eastern ocean meeting point (EOMP) at approximately 18° West, where the final escort group would meet the convoy and accompany it into the Western Approaches.

== Location ==
The mid-ocean meeting point was always north of 58° North and in the vicinity of 35° West, but evasive routing gave each convoy a somewhat different meeting point to avoid providing a fixed location where Axis submarines might wait to ambush convoys. Iceland provided a refueling base for Canadian and Royal Navy escort groups between escort assignments. United States Marine Corps troops occupied Iceland in July 1941; and the United States Navy began escorting supply ships from the United States to the Iceland garrison. In September 1941 the United States Navy invited convoys bound to and from the British Isles to join their Iceland supply convoys and enjoy the protection of United States Navy destroyers between the WOMP and the MOMP.

After the United States declared war the United States Navy suggested moving the convoy route south to shorten the distance between Newfoundland and the British Isles so one escort group of the Mid-Ocean Escort Force could accompany the convoy the entire distance from WOMP to EOMP. Ships bound to or from Iceland still met or departed their convoys at a more southerly MOMP, sometimes identified as the Iceland ocean meeting point (ICOMP). After convoys started assembling in New York City rather than Halifax Harbour, a Halifax ocean meeting point (HOMP) was established off Halifax for BX convoys of ships from New England and Canadian ports to join or leave the trans-Atlantic convoys.

== See also ==
- Mid-Atlantic Gap

== Bibliography ==
- Blair, Clay (1996). Hitler's U-Boat War: The Hunters 1939–1942. Random House. ISBN 0-394-58839-8.
- Hague, Arnold (2000). The Allied Convoy System 1939–1945. Annapolis, MD: Naval Institute Press. ISBN 1-55750-019-3.
- Macintyre, Donald (1971). The Naval War Against Hitler. New York: Charles Scribner's Sons. ISBN 978-0-68-412375-2.
- Morison, Samuel Eliot (1975). The Battle of the Atlantic: September 1939 – May 1943. Boston, MS: Little, Brown. OCLC 7395406 – via Archive Foundation.
- Vat, Dan van der (1988). The Atlantic Campaign (1st ed.). New York: Harper & Row. ISBN 0-06-015967-7 – via Archive Foundation.
