= Sutton tube =

Type of klystron for generating low intensity microwaves

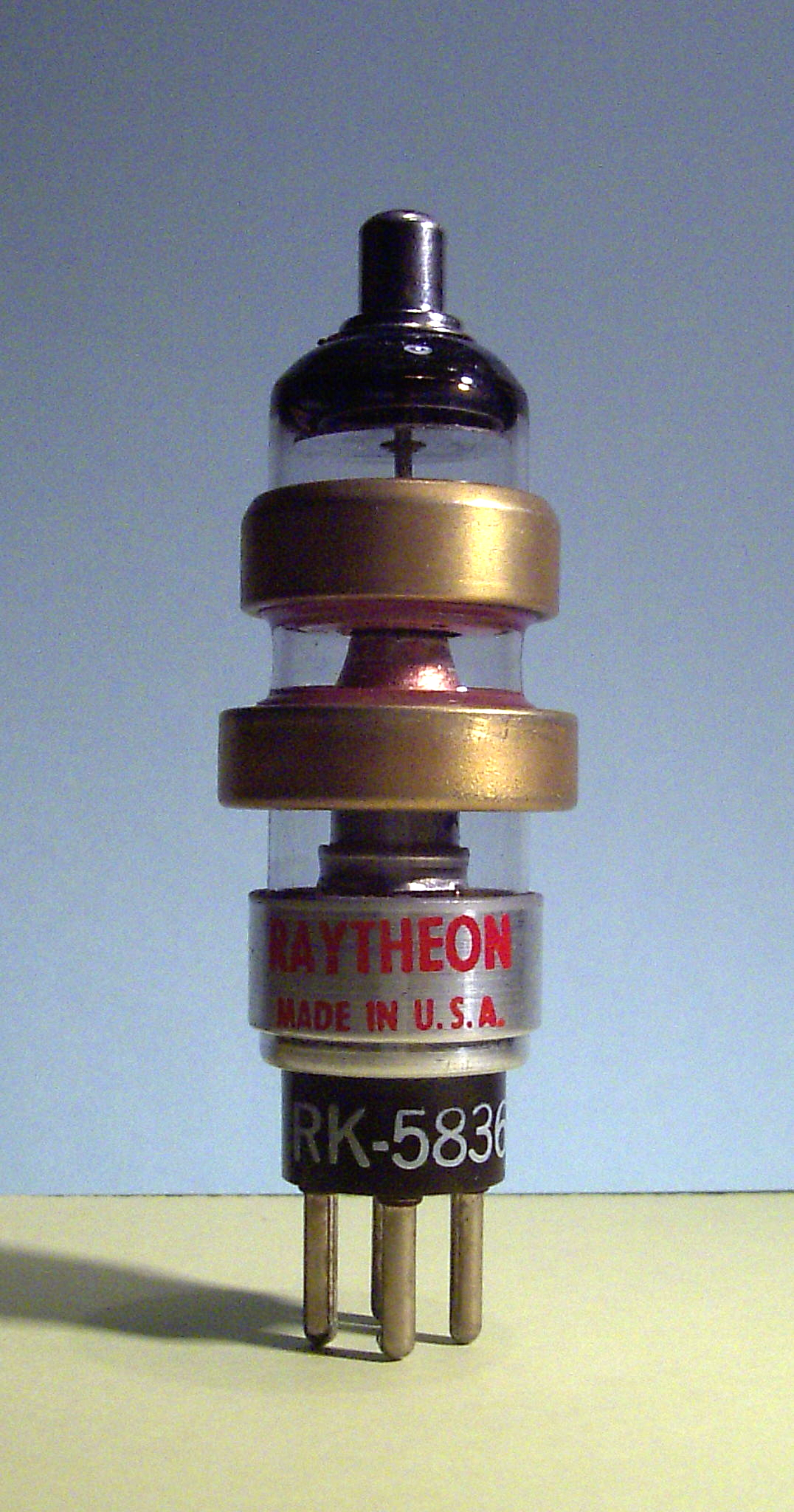
The 5836, a typical reflex klystron used as a low-power microwave source. Note the terminal on the top of the tube, used to power the repeller.

Sutton tube was the name given to the first reflex klystron, developed in 1940 by Robert W. Sutton of Signal School group at the Bristol University. The Sutton tube was developed as a local oscillator for the receiver of 10cm microwave radar sets. Due to its geometry and long drift space, it suffered from mode jumping through the tuning range. For this reason, from late 1941 onward, it was replaced in many sets by the Western Electric 707A (also known as McNally tube, named by its developer).

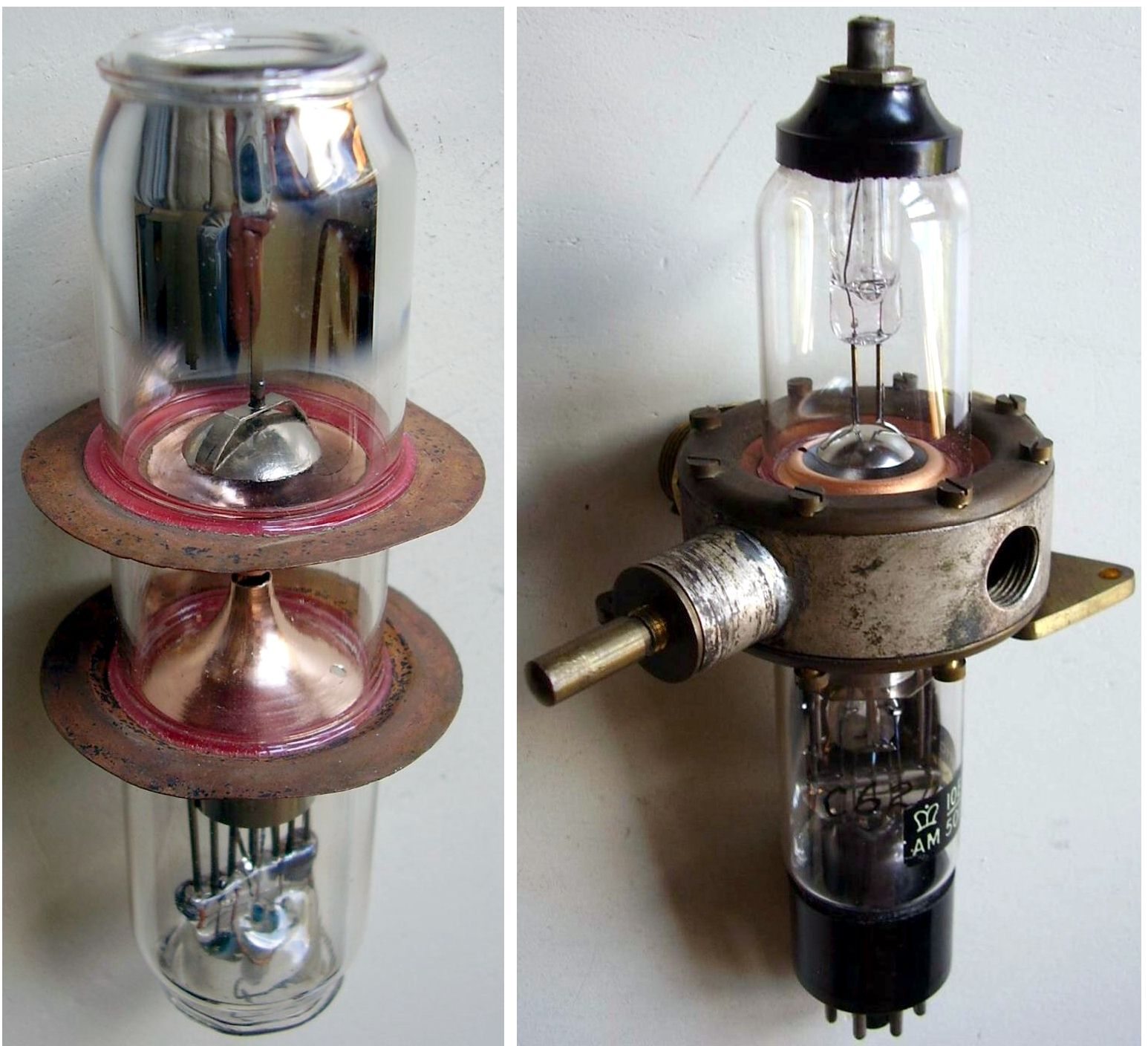
Here the photos of an unbased Sutton tube used in the development of the external tuner and an Air Ministry 10E7501 complete with the tuner.

The reflex klystron is a type of vacuum tube used to generate microwaves. It is a low-power device used primarily for two purposes: one is to provide a tuneable low-power frequency source for the local oscillators in receiver circuits, and the other, with minor modifications, as a switch that could turn on and off another microwave source. The second use, sometimes known as a soft Sutton tube or rhumbatron switch, was a key component in the development of microwave radar by Britain during World War II. Microwave switches of all designs, including these, are more generally known as T/R tubes or T/R cells.

The Sutton tube is named for one of its inventors, Robert Sutton, an expert in vacuum tube design. The original klystron designs had been developed in the late 1930s in the US, and Sutton was asked to develop a tuneable version. He developed the first models in late 1940 while working at the Admiralty Signals and Radar Establishment. Sutton tubes were widely used in a variety of forms during World War II and through the 1960s. Their role has since been taken over by solid state devices like the Gunn diode, which started to become available in the 1970s. "Rhumbatron" refers to the resonant cavity design that was part of many klystrons, referring to the rhumba because of the dance-like motion of the electrons.

== Basic klystron concept ==
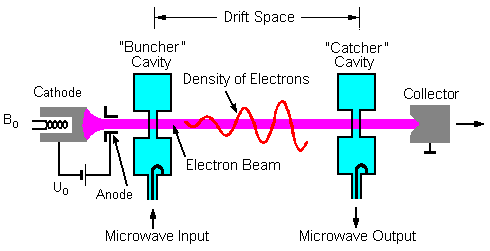
In a two-cavity klystron, the electrons "bunch up" as they move between the cavities, re-creating the original signal.

Klystrons share the basic concept that the microwave output is generated by progressively accelerating then slowing electrons in an open space surrounded by a resonant cavity. The easiest klystron designs to understand have two cavities.

The first cavity is connected to a source signal, and is designed to resonate at the desired frequency, filling its interior with an oscillating electric field. The cavity's dimensions are a function of the wavelength, most are flat cylinders the shape of a hockey puck of varying sizes. A hole is drilled through the middle, at the center of the "puck".

A stream of electrons fired from an electron gun passes through the hole, and the varying field causes them to either accelerate or decelerate depending on the value of the rapidly varying field at the time they pass. Beyond the cavity the accelerated electrons catch up to the decelerated ones, causing the electrons to bunch up in the stream. This causes the stream to re-create the original signal's pattern in the density of the electrons. This area of the tube has to be fairly long to allow time for this process to complete.

The electrons then pass through a second cavity, similar to the first. As they pass, the bunches cause a varying electric field to be induced in the cavity, re-creating the original signal but at much higher current. A tap point on this cavity provides the amplified microwave output.

== Local oscillators ==
The reflex klystron essentially folds the two-cavity design in half, using two opposing accelerating fields.

The introduction of the cavity magnetron caused a revolution in radar design, generating large amounts of power from a compact and easy-to-build device. However, it also required several additional developments before it could be used.

Among these was a suitable local oscillator about 45 MHz different than the transmitter signal, which fed the intermediate frequency section of the receiver circuits. The problem was that the magnetron's frequency drifted as it warmed and cooled, enough that some sort of tuneable microwave source was needed whose frequency could be adjusted to match. A second magnetron would not work, they would not drift in sync.

As the receiver circuit requires only very little output power, the klystron, first introduced only two years earlier, was a natural choice. Sutton, a well-known expert in tube design, was asked if he could provide a version that could be tuned across the same range as the magnetron's drift. An initial model available in 1940 allowed tuning with some effort. While it worked, it was not suitable for an operational system. Sutton and Thompson continued working on the problem, and delivered a solution in October 1940. Thompson named it for Sutton, while Sutton referred to it as the Thompson Tube. The former stuck.

Their advance was to use a single resonator and clever physical arrangement to provide the same effect as two cavities. He did this by placing a second electrode at the far end of the tube, the "reflector" or "repeller", which caused the electrons to turn around and start flowing back toward the gun, similar to the Barkhausen–Kurz tube. By changing the voltage of the reflector relative to the gun, the speed of the electrons when they reached the cavity the second time could be adjusted, within limits. The frequency was a function of the velocity of the electrons, providing the tuning function.

This modification effectively folded the klystron in half, with most of the "action" at the center of the tube where the input and output from the single cavity were located. Furthermore, only the interior of the cavity was inside the tube, the outer surface was in the form of a metal shell wrapped around the tube. Larger changes to the frequency could be made by replacing the outer shell, and this also provided a convenient location for mounting.

Unfortunately, the system needed two high-voltage power supplies, one for the initial acceleration in the gun, and a second between the gun and the reflector. And, due to the way it worked, the system was generally limited to milliwatts of power.

== Soft Sutton tube ==
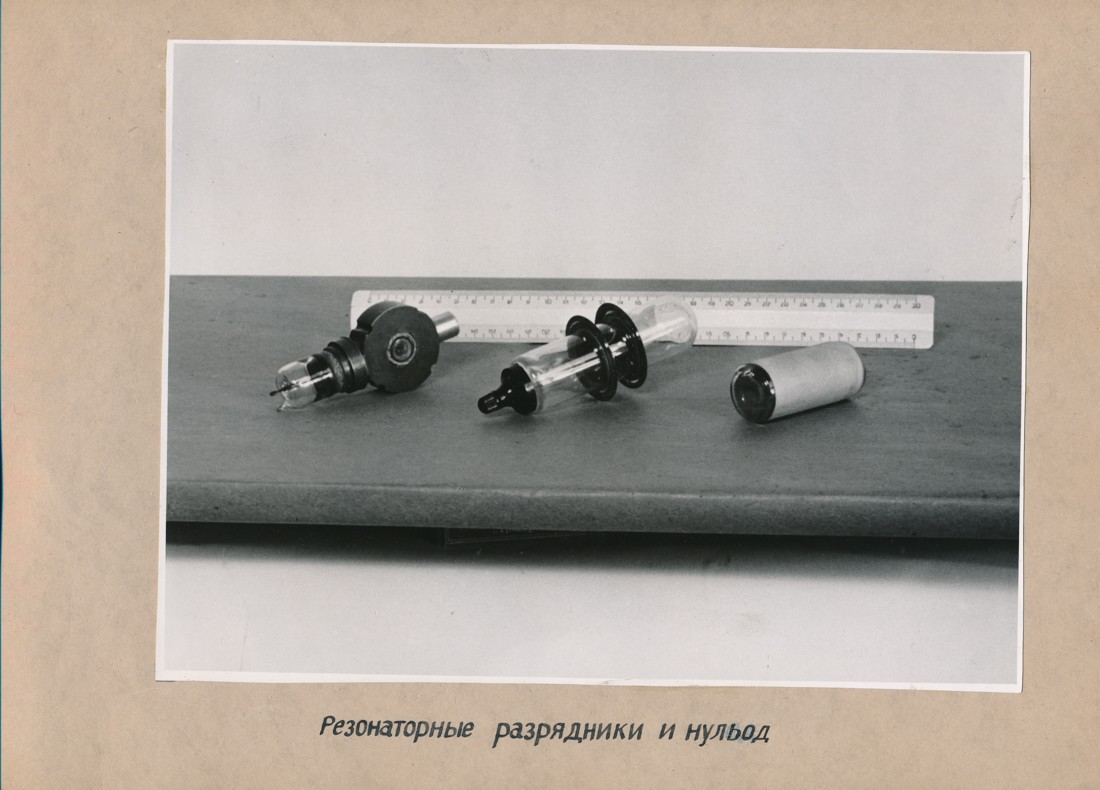
Replicas of World War II allied (left) and German T/R switch tubes

One of the advantages of using microwaves for radar is that the size of an antenna is based on the wavelength of the signal, and shorter wavelengths thus require much smaller antennas. This was vitally important for airborne radar systems. German aircraft, using longer wavelengths, required enormous antennas that slowed the aircraft between 25 and 50 km/h due to drag. Microwaves required antennas only a few centimetres long, and could easily fit within the aircraft nose.

This advantage was offset by the lack of a switching system to allow a single antenna to act as both a transmitter and receiver. This is not always a major problem; the Chain Home system made do with two sets of antennas, as did early airborne radars like the Mk. IV. In 1940 Bernard Lovell developed a solution for microwave radar by placing two sets of dipoles in front of a common parabolic dish and placing a disk of metal foil between them. However, this was not terribly successful, and the crystal diodes used as detectors frequently burned out as the signal bled through or around the disk. A solution using two spark gap tubes was also used, but was less than ideal.

A better solution was suggested by Arthur H. Cooke of the Clarendon Laboratory, and production development was taken up by H.W.B. Skinner along with A.G. Ward and A.T. Starr at the Telecommunications Research Establishment. They took a Sutton tube and disconnected the electron gun and reflector, leaving just the cavity. This was filled with a dilute gas, initially helium or hydrogen, but eventually settling on a tiny amount of water vapour and argon.

When the transmission signal was seen on the input, the gas would rapidly ionize (helped by a heater coil or radium). The free electrons in the plasma presented an almost perfect impedance source, blocking the signal from flowing to the output. As soon as the transmission stopped, the gas de-ionized and the impedance disappeared very rapidly. The tiny echoes caused by reflections from the target, arriving microseconds later, were far too small to cause the ionization, and allowed the signal to reach the output.

The usable soft Sutton tube arrived in March 1941, and was put into production as the CV43. It was first used as part of the AI Mk. VII radar, the first production microwave radar for aircraft. The system was widely used from then on, appearing in almost all airborne microwave radars, including the H2S radar and ASV Mark III radar.

Post-war intelligence revealed that the Germans were baffled by the purpose of the soft Sutton tube. Several examples fell into their hands, notably in the Rotterdam Gerät, an H2S that was captured in fairly complete form in February 1943. Interviews with German radar engineers after the war demonstrated that they could not understand the purpose of the unpowered tube.

The soft Sutton tube was used in a circuit known as a "T/R switch" (or many variations on that theme). Other spark tubes had been used for this purpose, in a design known as the "Branch-Duplexer". This consisted of two short lengths of waveguide about 1/4 of a wavelength, both of which turned on when the signal arrived. Because of the geometry of the layout, the two paths resulted in a reflection of the signal. Sutton tubes were used in a simpler design known as the "shunt branching circuit", which was T-shaped with the transmitter and antenna located at either end of the horizontal portion of the T, and the receiver at the end of the vertical portion. By locating the Sutton tube at the right location along the waveguide to the receiver, the same effect as the branch-duplexer could be arranged.
