= DMS-1000 =

- Country of origin: United States
- Designer: MIT Radiation Laboratory
- Type: prototype microwave ASV

The DMS-1000 was an experimental surface search radar developed by the MIT Radiation Laboratory and produced in limited numbers by Western Electric in late 1942. The first unit was sent to be used by the RAF Coastal Command in a Liberator GR and entered service in January 1943 under the name ASV Mark IV. Seven additional examples were received by June, sent to No. 224 Squadron RAF, where they were used operationally over the Mid-Atlantic Gap. No more were produced and production switched to the similar AN/APS-2 for further deliveries, known in RAF service as ASV Mark V.

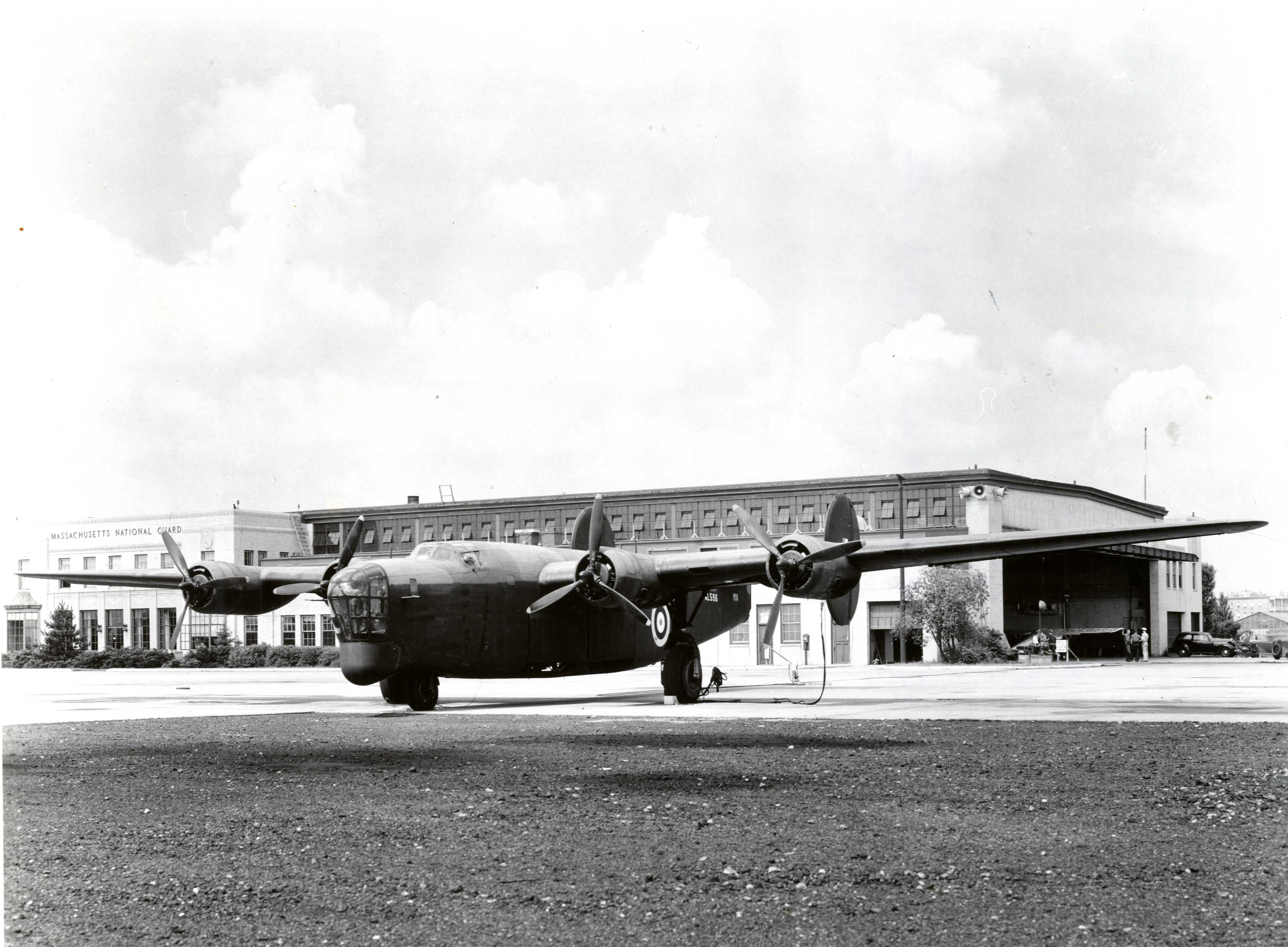
B-24 Liberator with mounted DMS-1000 radar, East Boston Airport
