= Naxos radar detector =

Radar warning receiver in World War II

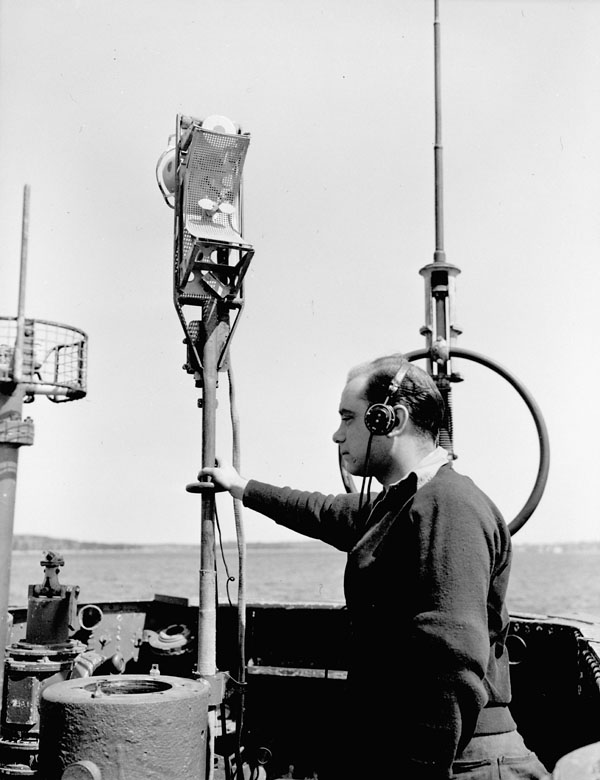
The naval version of Naxos was used by U-boats to detect aircraft carrying ASV Mk. III radars, which had been developed from the H2S equipment. This U-boat is equipped with the Fliege and Tunis antennas.

The Naxos radar warning receiver was a World War II German countermeasure to S band microwave radar produced by a cavity magnetron. Introduced in September 1943, it replaced Metox, which was incapable of detecting centimetric radar. Two versions were widely used, the FuG 350 Naxos Z that allowed night fighters to home in on H2S radars carried by RAF Bomber Command aircraft, and the FuMB 7 Naxos U for U-boats, offering early warning of the approach of RAF Coastal Command patrol aircraft equipped with ASV Mark III radar. A later model, Naxos ZR, provided warning of the approach of RAF night fighters equipped with AI Mk. VIII radar.

== Background ==
Prior to the introduction of the cavity magnetron, radar systems used traditional vacuum tube electronics and were limited to about 1.5 m wavelength (200 MHz frequency) in British use, and as low as 50 cm (600 MHz) in German systems. Both could receive the transmissions of their opposing radar systems and radar warning receivers were widely used by both sides in a number of roles.

By 1942, the British had made enough progress on the magnetron to begin introducing new radars using it, including the AI Mk. VIII radar for night fighters, ASV Mk. III radar for sea-surface search (anti-submarine) and the H2S radar for bomber guidance. None of the existing German receivers could operate at the magnetron's 10 cm wavelength (3 GHz frequency), and the introduction of the ASV Mk. III, in particular, led to significant losses among the U-boat fleet during the summer of 1943.

Before the magnetron had been deployed operationally, there was a great debate in Britain over whether or not Bomber Command should be allowed to use it. Unlike other types of tube electronics of the era, which are quite fragile, the main component of the magnetron is a large block of copper. If an aircraft carrying one were shot down and recovered, there was a very good chance the block would survive, at which point the secret would be revealed to anyone familiar with microwave techniques. This is precisely what occurred on the night of 2/3 February 1943, when the second mission to attempt to use H2S led to one of the Short Stirling bombers carrying it being shot down near Rotterdam. The magnetron was recovered and this Rotterdam Gerät (gadget, or device) led to the rapid formation of a study group to exploit it.

The group first met at the Telefunken offices in Berlin on 22 February. Although the possibility of developing radars using it was considered, the much more pressing need was the development of countermeasures to this now-undetectable radar. This effect was hampered by the industry's recent decision to give up on microwave research, considering it to be a dead-end, as had British engineers before the introduction of the magnetron. Adding to their problems was the lack of a suitable rugged crystal detector, which was the only system able to reliably detect these high frequency signals. Enormous effort was expended to address these problems, and prototype units were available by the summer.

== Aircraft use ==
The first operational use was in a Junkers Ju 88 on 2 September 1943. The unit, and others that were delivered during this time, proved extremely difficult to keep working. Even when they did work, their angle accuracy was limited, and it did not provide elevation or range information of any sort. Operators found it useful for finding the bomber stream, at ranges as great as 35 kilometres (22 mi), but could not use it to home in on individual aircraft. The Naxos Z system's rotating antenna for airborne use was driven by a DC motor, and comprised what appear to be a pair of vacuum tubes laid flat on a circular rotating carriage, which would be enclosed within a radome of either hemispherical shape for single-engine fighter use, or in a more aerodynamic "teardrop" shape for placement atop a twin-engined night fighter's canopy.

News of the device made its way to England, where some level of panic broke out when it was suggested that the H2S could be leading to the aircraft's demise. Arguments over the use of H2S by bomber command started anew. These were finally put to rest in July 1944 when a Naxos-equipped Ju 88 night fighter became lost and landed in the UK. The crew described the operation of Naxos as being of little overall use, while another device, Flensburg was able to home in on individual aircraft's Monica radar. Monica was removed from service and H2S was allowed to continue throughout the war.

When it was clear that the magnetron was known to the Germans, the RAF released its night fighter version, AI Mk. VIII radar, for use over Europe. This radar provided a significant advantage to the RAF over the older systems used by the Germans, and for the first time the RAF was able to seriously disrupt German night fighter operations by attacking them directly. Aircraft that did survive reported that there was no warning of the attack, and it was quickly surmised that the RAF had introduced a new microwave Airborne Interception (AI) radar. This led to the rapid introduction of the Naxos ZR, tuned to the Mk. VIII's frequency and equipped with rearward facing antennas.

Altogether, about 700 Naxos Z and ZRs were produced.

== Submarine use ==
Given the concerns over the possibility of losing a magnetron to the Germans, for some time through the summer of 1942 the RAF limited future deliveries to Coastal Command aircraft for anti-submarine duties, where the possibility of capture was remote. However, Bomber Command fought this decision and by the time deliveries started late in the year they received all of the units. This was reconsidered once again when it was becoming clear the U-boats had been equipped with some sort of detector for the existing ASV Mk. II radar, as they could be seen disappearing on the radar as the aircraft approached, and this was put to fearsome use in early 1943. A new agreement was reached where Coastal and Bomber Command would split the deliveries about 65/35.

When the first of these ASV Mk. III radar systems began reaching service in early 1943, the effects were profound. Once again British aircraft could attack submarines with no warning until the last seconds when the Leigh light was illuminated, far too late for the submarine to take defensive action. A new phase started where British aircraft pressed into the Bay of Biscay and German submarines were told to remain on the surface and fight it out in daylight rather than risk almost certain death at night. This led to a crash program to equip their fleet with a variation of Naxos that could detect the new radar.

The resulting Naxos U initially proved to have very short detection range, too short to be really useful. This led to a series of new antenna designs before the final Fliege (fly) semi-parabolic system was introduced. This had the distinct disadvantage that it was not waterproof and had to be removed from its mounting and taken inside in order to dive. Even with this antenna, warning times were on the order of one minute. An even later version, Naxos ZM, spun the antenna at 1,300 RPM to display the angle directly on a cathode-ray tube display in the submarine. This was still under development when the war ended.

Although Naxos was useful against ASV Mk. III, by 1944 the British and US were already well on their way to introducing newer magnetron-based radar systems, like the American H2X, operating at even higher frequencies in the 3 cm band. The first of these ASV Mk. VI radars were being introduced to service just as Naxos was being fitted. As a result, Naxos never had as great a success as the Metox it replaced.

== Other developments ==
Experiments with a ground-based version of Naxos using directional antennas had been carried out under the name Corfu. Some effort was made to develop this into an airborne version, FuG 351 Corfu Z, but this never entered service.

An attempt to address the limited resolution of Naxos was undertaken in the Korfu, which had a better antenna system and more sensitive receiver.

Naxos receivers were also combined with the parabolic antennas from Würzburg radar systems to produce a long-range receiver tuned to the British Oboe radio navigation system. The system later used a Domeyer receiver and became the Naxburg system. Oboe broadcast pulses from the aircraft that needed to be powerful enough to be received by ground stations in the UK. This made them relatively easy to pick out at short ranges, as long as the receiver was tuned to a suitable frequency. When such a signal was detected, false pulses identical to those received from the aircraft were re-broadcast from the ground. Stations in the UK thus received two or more signals for every signal they sent out, which confused the detectors.

== See also ==
- H2X, the American X-band bombing radar immune to detection from the Naxos detecting device.
