= Metox radar detector =

Radar warning receiver used in WW2

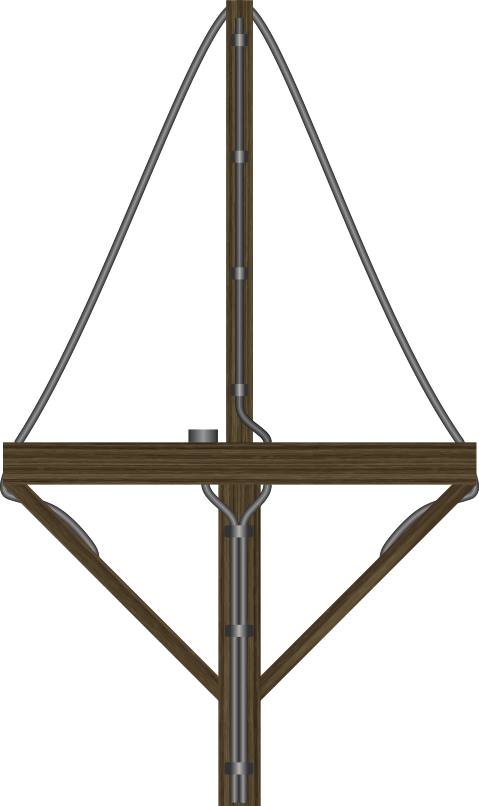
The FuMB-1 Metox antenna consisted of five pieces of wood tied together into a cross, with wires wrapped around it. It was installed into a bracket on the conning tower and periodically was rotated by hand. British photographs of the antenna led to their nickname, "Biscay Cross".

The R600A Metox, named after its manufacturer, was a pioneering high-frequency radar warning receiver (RWR) used by the German forces on U-boats from 1942 to 1945. It was initially installed to receive signals transmitted by British radars.

== Manufacture and purpose ==
The Metox was manufactured by a small French company in occupied Paris. It was tuned to receive the 1.5-metre (200 MHz) signals used by many British radars of the early and mid-Second World War, notably the ASV Mk. II radar used by RAF Coastal Command to detect U-boats. It is not clear whether the design was German or French or both. It was installed on German U-boats starting in 1942 and used until the end of the war. The system given the official title of Funkmessbeobachtungsgerät (FuMB 1, [Radio measuring device]).

== British radar ==
From July 1940, the British fitted the RAF Mk II AI (Airborne Interception) radar into Coastal Command aircraft for use as the Mk II "1 1/2-metre ASV". The radar suffered from problems due to land clutter and inability to determine height, which caused its failure in night fighters but these were no handicap in this new role. With two range scales, 0–9 mi (0–14 km) and 0–36 mi (0–58 km), it could detect surfaced U-boats at up to 12 mi (19 km) and land at up to 70 mi (110 km) away, though a typical U-boat detection range was 5 mi (8.0 km). The radar had a fairly crude display but was able to give the range and an approximate direction within an arc either side of the aircraft heading. Returns were lost in sea clutter once the aircraft was within about 1 mi (1.6 km) of the U-boat but usually by then, the aircraft was within visual range and the U-boat was well into a crash dive.

== Leigh light ==
Wing Commander Humphry de Verde Leigh developed the Leigh light, a powerful floodlight steered by the ASV radar, allowing aircraft to search for U-boats at night. The U-boat was tracked by the radar with the light switched off, following the radar track. Once the returns were lost, the light would be switched on bathing the U-boat in light. The first successful attack was on U-502 on 5 July 1942. The sudden light was often the first indication to the U-boat crew that they had been found. The Leigh light was initially very successful, particularly in the Bay of Biscay. Metox was the German answer to the British radar. Metox sets received the transmitted pulses from the ASV and rendered them as audible beeps. It enjoyed the usual advantage of radar detectors over radar in that the signal is direct and only had to travel one way whereas the radar has to detect the very weak reflection from the submarine. Most radars increase the number of pulses and decrease the width of the pulses when switched to a shorter range, the shorter pulse widths allow the radar to look at closer objects. Metox exploited the fact that once the radar operator changed the range indication from 36 mi (58 km) to 9 mi (14 km), the pulse repetition frequency of the radar's transmitter doubled. Radar cannot detect any reflections returned earlier than half a pulse width so when the U-boat was closer than 9 mi (14 km) the operator would change to the shorter scale. If the Metox set started beeping at twice the rate, the U-boat knew that they had been detected. By the time the aircraft was close enough to the U-boat's position to illuminate with the Leigh light, the U-boat was well under the water. As a bonus, the Metox set would also provide warning in excess of visual range in daylight.

== Enigma code ==
In December 1942 British code breakers regained the ability to decipher messages encrypted with naval four-rotor Enigma machines and the Germans noticed the resulting increase in U-boat sightings. Based on their confidence in the Enigma machine, as well as the testimony of a captured British bomber pilot, the Germans came to the erroneous conclusion that the Allies could detect emissions produced by the Metox. The executive officer of U-230, Captain Herbert Werner said of Metox, "Then, on August 3 [1943], we received a message from Headquarters which had a greater impact on our lives than any since the beginning of the Allied offensive.

ALL U-BOATS. ATTENTION. ALL U-BOATS. SHUT OFF METOX AT ONCE. ENEMY IS CAPABLE OF INTERCEPTING. KEEP RADIO SILENCE UNTIL FURTHER NOTICE.

== Obsolete ==
Metox was eventually countered by a version of the 10 cm (3 GHz) H2S radar, which Metox could not detect and once again the Leigh light forced U-boat crews to refuse to run surfaced at night. Even during the day the new radar was easily able to detect a submerged U-boat's periscope or snorkel, which earlier radars employing longer wavelengths could not do. Metox was superseded by the Naxos radar detector that detected 10-centimetre wavelength H2S signals but was unable to detect the higher, 3 cm (10 GHz) frequency of the American H2X radar.
