= 1942 Herefordshire TRE Halifax crash =

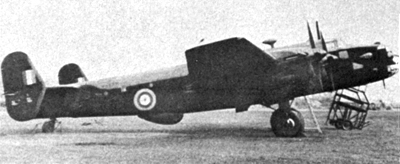
- Halifax V9977

Accident
- Date: 16.15, Sunday 7 June 1942
- Site: Courtfield Estate, Welsh Bicknor, Herefordshire, England 51.8522°N 2.5874°W

Aircraft
- Aircraft type: Handley Page Halifax
- Operator: TFU
- Registration: V9977
- Flight origin: RAF Defford, Worcestershire
- Destination: RAF Defford
- Passengers: 4
- Crew: 7
- Fatalities: 11
- Survivors: 0

V9977 was an Handley Page Halifax II that had been sent to the Telecommunications Research Establishment (TRE) at RAF Defford to be used as a flying testbed for the H2S radar.

On the afternoon of 7 June 1942, one of its Rolls-Royce Merlin engines caught fire and led to the aircraft crashing near the England-Wales border, killing all eleven crew-members. Among the dead was Alan Blumlein of EMI, who was well known as the inventor of stereophonic sound recording and the 405-line television system used in the UK until 1985.

Investigators determined that improper engine maintenance/assembly procedures caused the accident. It remains the deadliest crash in the history of military test flight in the UK.

== History ==
=== Construction ===
V9977 was an early model Halifax II, which introduced the more powerful Merlin XX engine and a number of other detail changes over the original model.

=== Chosen for H2S ===
At a meeting on 23 December 1941, the Secretary of State for Air, Archibald Sinclair, directed the TRE should direct their work on H2S radar towards the new four-engine bombers, Shorts Stirling, Handley Page Halifax and Avro Lancaster. Immediately thereafter, Philip Dee, B J O'Kane and Geoffrey Hensby visited the Aeroplane and Armament Experimental Establishment at Boscombe Down to examine the available aircraft and concluded that the Halifax had the best possibilities for mounting the scanner in different locations for testing.

On 1 January 1942, Bernard Lovell received orders from Albert Rowe, director of the TRE, to take over the direction of H2S. Three days later he visited Handley Page with Bob King, a TRE fitter who was well acquainted with the installation of test systems on a variety of aircraft, and Whitaker from Nash & Thompson, who were building the scanner system. They had collectively planned for the radar to be installed in a large 8 feet (2.4 m) long radome under the aircraft.

They were met at the factory by a team of high-ranking members of the Halifax design team, including the chief designer, who was outraged at the idea of installing a huge radar scanner on a design built to be as fast as possible while carrying a huge bombload. The TRE team replied that it would be better to place a few bombs on the target than a huge load in a field, but could not explain much beyond that as they were under orders not to give away any details of the system. It is not recorded what arguments may have occurred within the company, but the direction from Prime Minister Churchill giving H2S the highest national priority overrode any complaints.

V9977 landed at RAF Hurn on 27 March 1942 already modified with the perspex radome. The electronics had been assembled at Leeson House as early as January and was being tested in Bristol Blenheim V6000. A second example was fit to V9977 by 27 March, awaiting the new hydraulic scanner from Nash & Thompson which arrived on 16 April. After some debugging, the system was operational the next day, but performed very poorly, with towns becoming visible at only 4 to 5 miles (6.4 to 8.0 km) from an altitude of 8,000 ft.

It was during this period that plans were made to move the TRE away from its exposed location on the English south coast to a more inland location. After considerable searching, Malvern was finally selected and the TRE moved en masse in May 1942. Their experimental aircraft moved from Hurn to RAF Defford. Further work on the system continued to improve the effective range, and by early June they were achieving 25 to 30 miles (40 to 48 km).

=== The crash ===
On the weekend of 6 and 7 June, Lovell and the team met with Alan Blumlein and two of his associates from EMI to examine the system with an eye to beginning production. After the EMI team left to return to their hotel, Lovell flew in V9977 and received strong returns from Gloucester, Cheltenham and several other towns at previously invisible ranges.

The EMI team decided they should see this for themselves, and took off in V9977 at about 2:50 pm on the 7th heading for the Bristol Channel. At 4:20 pm the aircraft was seen over the Forest of Dean with its outboard starboard engine on fire. Shortly after, the left wing broke off and the aircraft rolled over and crashed in a field on the Courtfield estate in Lydbrook near Welsh Bicknor on the north side of the River Wye. All aboard were killed.

News of the crash did not reach Defford until 7:35. At 9 pm, Lovell and O'Kane were driven to the site to retrieve the top secret cavity magnetron from the wreckage.

=== Investigations ===
Due to the secret nature of the aircraft, for many years the only information available on the crash was a single index card at the Ministry of Defence that stated the accident occurred when the crew attempted to restart a failed engine which then set on fire. The extinguishers did not work and it appeared that the bottles had not been filled, and it was suggested they might have been delivered empty and never checked. They postulated that they attempted to restart the engine in order to supply power for "special equipment to enable experiment to be continued". The lack of detail led Blumlein's wife and Isaac Shoenberg, head of EMI's research division, to suspect sabotage.

In the 1980s, members of the Royal Radar Establishment, which had taken over the TRE in 1953, began their own investigation. This was led by W.H. Sleigh, who retired in 1984 and spent the next year meticulously following up every lead. Among the bits of evidence was a series of interviews with the witness to the crash, who narrowly missed being hit by the aircraft, and a former Rolls-Royce engineer who had examined the engine after the crash.

While the pilot was experienced, he was new to the Halifax with only 13 hours on the type. The rest of the crew were all inexperienced. There were several design flaws with the early Halifax that also contributed to the crash; the fuel valves to the engines were on the wrong side of a fireproof bulkhead, as were the extinguisher bottles. Additionally, the controls to cut off fuel to the engines were placed in a difficult to reach position far behind the cockpit.

But the primary reason for the accident was a change that was made by Rolls-Royce shortly after V9977 entered service. Rolls had noticed that the tappet valves on the engine tended to work loose in service, which was potentially dangerous. In order to keep them in the proper locations, they had begun to install the valves with slightly less clearance in order that they would reach the proper location in service. This was easily accomplished in the factory, but for existing engines the lock nuts holding the valves in place had to be removed, 48 on each engine, the valve adjusted, and the nuts re-tightened.

This procedure was applied to V9977 shortly before its fatal flight. One of the nuts on the engine had not been properly tightened and came loose in flight. The valve began to work its way loose and eventually broke off. This allowed the fuel-air mixture entering the engine to flow into the area under the rocker cover and catch on fire. Although the engine failed, the propeller kept it rotating, operating the fuel pumps and continuing to spray new fuel into the fire.

The fire eventually worked its way back through the fuel lines and into the main fuel tanks. The flight engineer had to cut off the fuel supply using the controls in the fuselage, but never made it. The fire apparently broke out at an altitude of 15,000 feet, more than enough to bail out, but no one left the aircraft. It is suggested that the crew had parachutes but the observers did not, so they decided to remain with the aircraft and perform a forced landing. They almost made it; the aircraft did not break up until about 350 feet.

Sleigh sent a copy of his investigation to Lovell in September 1985, who included passages in his 1991 book, Echos of War.

== Memorials ==
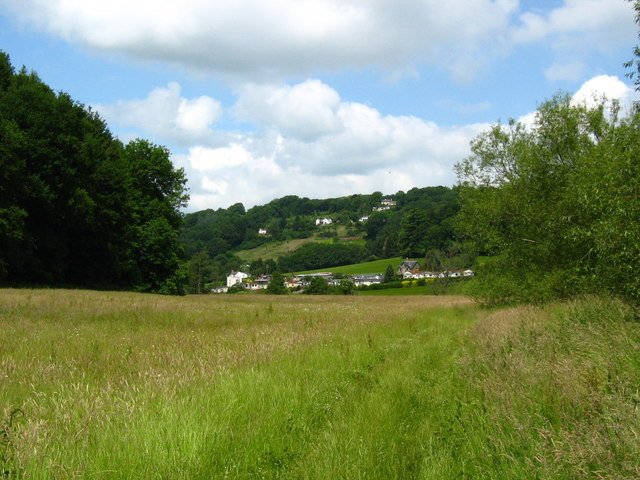
The area in June 2009

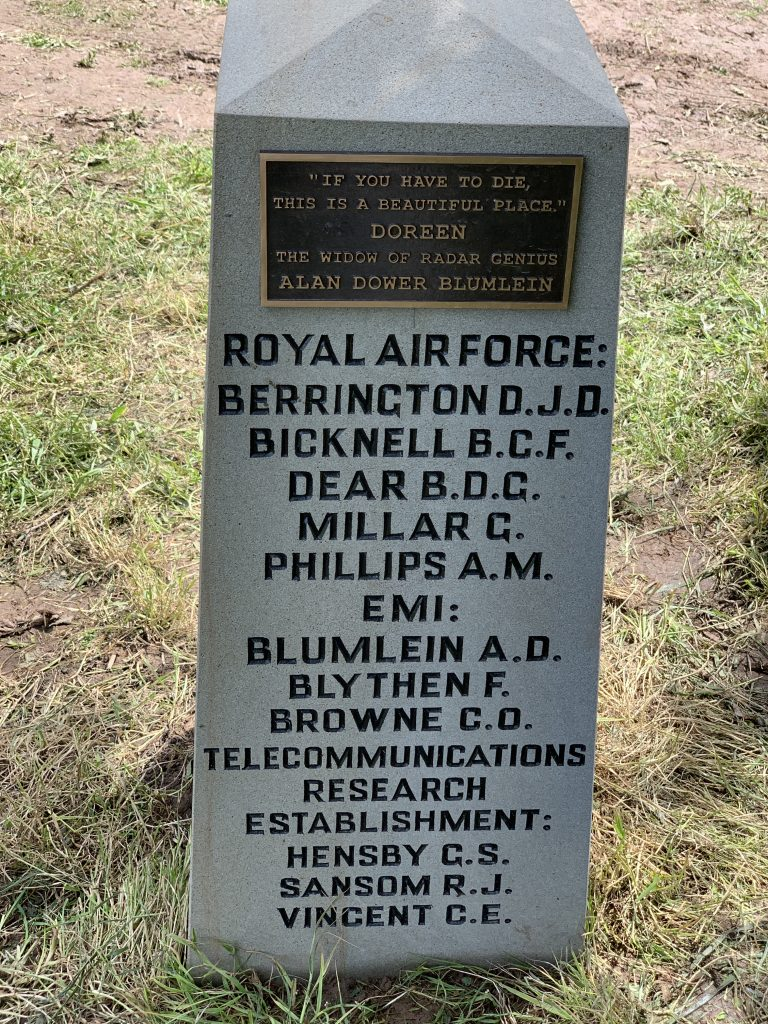
memorial

The site today is a few metres north of Herefordshire-Gloucestershire boundary, north of the B4234; the Wye Valley Walk passes close by.

A memorial was built next to the site, with a memorial service on 10 June 2019; the memorial was mostly due to an employee of the Hereford Times, with help from the EMI Archive Trust.

== Victims ==
Seven RAF personnel were killed plus Alan Blumlein and three other radar scientists.

== See also ==
- 1942 in the United Kingdom
- List of accidents and incidents involving military aircraft (1940–1942)
- Francis Jones (physicist) and Alec Reeves, who developed OBOE
