= 1944 Neuleiningen Douglas DC-3 shootdown =

1944 plane shootdown

Shootdown
- Date: 24 September 1944
- Summary: Shootdown
- Site: Over Neuleiningen, Nazi Germany

Aircraft
- Aircraft type: Douglas C-47 Dakota III
- Operator: 437 Sqn RCAF
- Registration: KG653
- Flight origin: RAF Pershore
- 1st stopover: Cagliari Elmas Airport
- Last stopover: RAF Castel Benito
- Destination: Karachi
- Passengers: 20
- Crew: 3
- Fatalities: 23
- Survivors: 0

On 24 September 1944, Douglas C-47 Dakota serial number KG653 operated by 437 Squadron of the Royal Canadian Air Force was shot down over Neuleiningen by a Messerschmitt Bf 109 after it veered off course into Germany, killing all 23 occupants on board.

== Accident ==
The flight took off from RAF Pershore at 3:30 local time. Mid-flight, it encountered poor weather (dark low clouds, heavy rain, thunder, and lightning) and entered Germany. Later, a Messerschmitt Bf 109 piloted by Julius Meimberg of the Luftwaffe attacked the C-47, firing at its right engine. The pilot then performed a split S, but the wing tore off and it crashed near Neuleningen, killing all 23 occupants.
