= Throckmorton, Worcestershire =

Village in Worcestershire, England

Coordinates: 52.145128°N 2.030097°W

Throckmorton
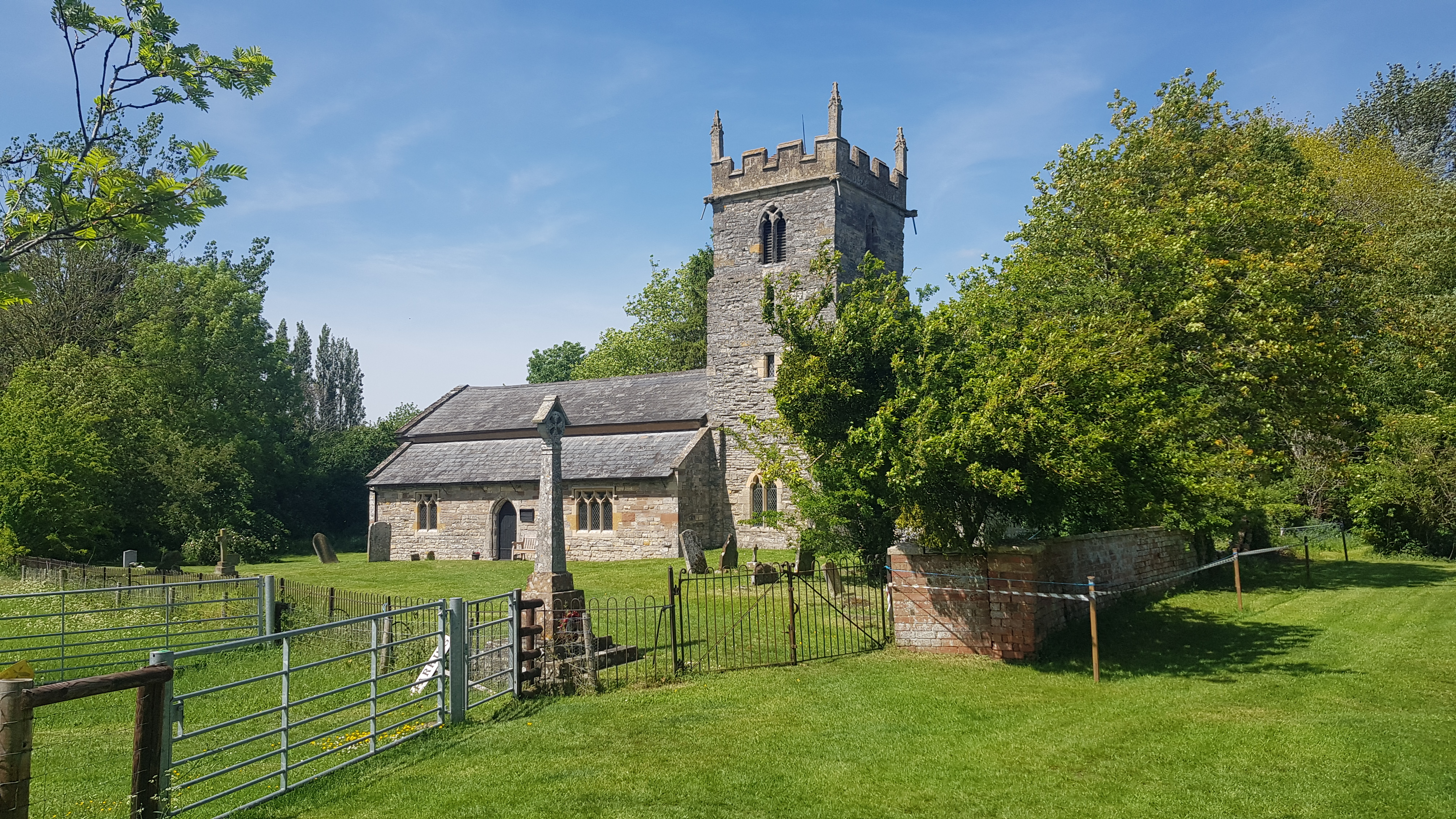
- Throckmorton Church

- Location within Worcestershire
- Population: 266 (2021 census)
- OS grid reference: SO980496
- Civil parish: Throckmorton
- District: Wychavon
- Shire county: Worcestershire
- Region: West Midlands
- Country: England
- Sovereign state: United Kingdom
- Post town: PERSHORE
- Postcode district: WR10
- Police: West Mercia
- Fire: Hereford and Worcester
- Ambulance: West Midlands

Throckmorton is a small village and civil parish in the administrative district of Wychavon, in the county of Worcestershire, England.

The village lies 3.5 miles northeast of Pershore, five miles north-west of Evesham and 9 miles southeast of the city of Worcester. At the 2021 census, it had a population of 266.

The name Throckmorton possibly derives from the Old English þrocmeretūn or þrocmōrtūn, meaning 'settlement by a pond with a drain' or 'settlement by a moor with a drain'.

== The church ==
The village is ancient and the earliest extant remains are parts of the church and bell-tower (now a chapelry), dating from the 13th century. Excavations discovered the stone foundations of an even earlier church on the site. The church has no electricity and is lit by gas-lamps and candles.

== QinetiQ Pershore ==
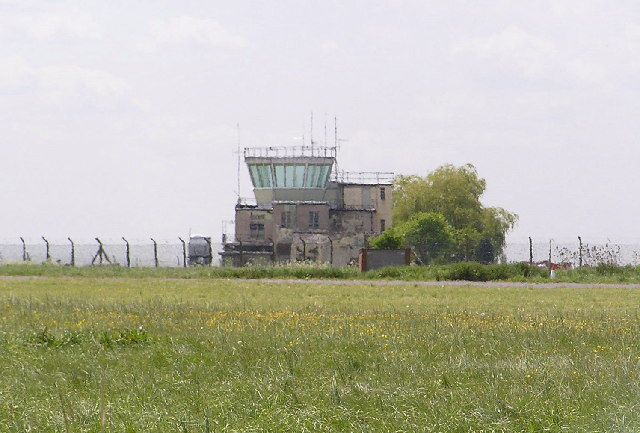
Disused control tower, Pershore Airfield

Formerly RAF Pershore, also known as Throckmorton Airfield, the site is owned and operated by QinetiQ as a Business Park and Trials Centre.

At the periphery of the village is the former military airfield officially known as RAF Pershore. Archaeological investigations of the airfield have suggested that it was originally a Roman site. The airfield was built in 1940 during the Second World War and was home to No 23 Operational Training Unit equipped with Wellington bombers. Subsequently, the airfield was home to No 1 Ferry Unit, No. 10 Advanced Flying Training School and several other RAF units then latterly by the Royal Radar Establishment Flying Unit.

The airfield was also sometimes used by Vulcan and Valiant V-bombers as one of a number of dispersal sites for the RAF's V-Force nuclear-deterrent; none were ever dispersed on anything other than training missions. In response to a question raised in Parliament, assurance was given that there are no records of radioactive contamination as a result of this use of the site as no V-bomber was ever dispersed with live weapons.

Several plans have been put forward for the development of the site, which was used in 2001 as a burial ground for the carcasses of over 100,000 animals afflicted with foot and mouth disease. In 2008 it was suggested that the site be used as a prison camp to relieve overcrowding in Britain's jails. In 2008 proposals were put forward by QinetiQ to use the site for the development of an eco-town for a population of up to 20,000.

From 2010 to 2015, the airfield hosted Throckmorton Air Show to benefit local charities.

In 2019, people from Throckmorton and surrounding villages came together to share their opinions on the Throckmorton Airfield housing development. The development would bring over 2,000 houses to the area as well as schools, services and employment.

== The Throckmorton family ==
The village gave its name to the Throckmorton family.

== In the media ==
The village has had a number of television and radio documentaries made about it, notably by Channel 4's archaeological television programme Time Team in 2002 and BBC Radio 4 in 2006.

== Culture and countryside ==
The surrounding countryside is that celebrated by A. E. Housman and Edward Elgar, and there are numerous heritage sites locally.
