= RAF Defford =

Former Royal Air Force station in Worcestershire, England

RAF Defford
- Near Defford, Worcestershire in England

Site information
- Type: Royal Air Force station
- Owner: Air Ministry
- Operator: Royal Air Force

Location
- Shown within Worcestershire
- Coordinates: 52°05′49″N 002°08′35″W

Site history
- Built: 1941
- In use: 1941-1957

Airfield information
- Elevation: 20 metres (66 ft) AMSL
Runways
Direction	Length and surface
02/20	1,850 metres (6,070 ft) Asphalt
09/27	1,275 metres (4,183 ft) Asphalt
15/33	1,340 metres (4,396 ft) Asphalt

Royal Air Force Defford, or more simply RAF Defford, is a former Royal Air Force station located 1.1 miles (1.8 km) northwest of Defford, Worcestershire, England.

== History ==
=== Second World War ===
At the outbreak of the Second World War, Croome Court and its surrounding estate was requisitioned by the Ministry of Works. The main Palladian house was initially leased for a year to the Dutch Government as a possible refuge for Queen Wilhelmina of the Netherlands to escape the Nazi occupation of the Netherlands. However, evidence shows that they only stayed for two weeks at most.

Construction of RAF Defford was started at the outbreak of war, and completed in 1941. For a few months the airfield was used as a satellite station by the Vickers Wellington bombers of No. 23 Operational Training Unit RAF (OTU), based a few miles away at RAF Pershore.

In May 1942, the Telecommunications Research Establishment (TRE), responsible for radar research and development, and located near Swanage, moved to Malvern College. At the same time the Telecommunications Flying Unit (TFU), later named the Radar Research Flying Unit (RRFU), which operated flight trials on behalf of the TRE, transferred its aircraft to Defford.

So hurried was the move to Defford that many of the personnel had to be accommodated in tents at first. However, at Defford the tempo of work carried out by TFU increased month by month, and by 1945 there were approximately 2,500 personnel and 100 aircraft on the station.

Civilian scientists, flying from Defford with aircrews drawn from the Royal Air Force and Royal Navy, tested radar systems which were to revolutionize the operational capability of Allied aircraft. Early successes with Airborne Interception (AI) systems were demonstrated by John "Cats Eyes" Cunningham and other night fighter pilots. Air to Surface Vessel (ASV) radar enabled the German U-boat menace to be effectively countered in 1943, and thus was critical to the success of the Battle of the Atlantic. By 1944, H2S radar was enabling accurate navigation and target identification to be achieved by Bomber Command crews, taking part in the strategic bombing offensive.

No. 1001 Signals Unit RAF and the Special Installation Unit RAF were also here at some point.

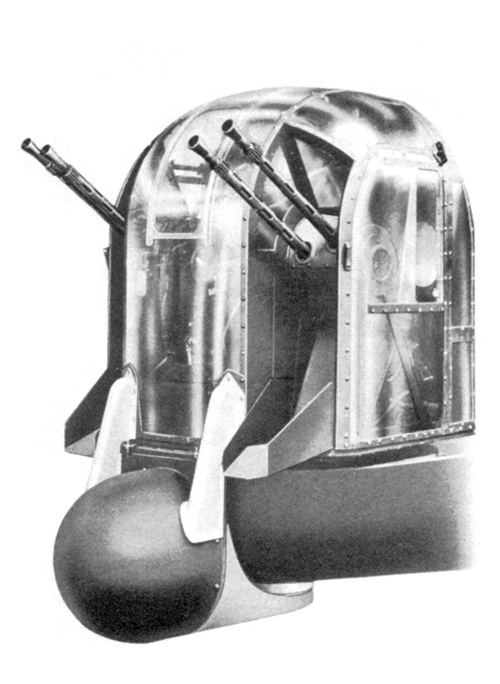
The Automatic Gun-Laying Turret (AGLT) Village Inn FN121 tail turret as fitted on a Lancaster test flown from RAF Defford.

There were many other notable "firsts" demonstrated by TFU. A converted Wellington bomber was the forerunner of the modern AWACS aircraft. This was successfully used to detect fast-moving German E-boats, and to control their interception by other aircraft. The world's first automatic "hands off" approach and landing was made by Boeing 247 DZ203 at Defford in January 1945.

=== Postwar use ===
TFU remained at Defford after the war, and was renamed the Radar Research Flying Unit (RRFU) in 1953. However, the airstrip at Defford was too short to allow the operation of the large "V" bombers on flight trials, and so RRFU moved to nearby RAF Pershore in 1957.

In 1980 the former Signals Research and Development Establishment was moved to Defford as a Royal Signals and Radar Establishment facility due to the flat terrain (geologically in the flood plain of the River Avon) for good satellite dish positioning and the nearby Bredon Hill for satellite simulators. RSRE was involved in the design and testing of the Skynet 4 military communications satellites and their ground facilities and terminals.

Most of the technical and domestic sites at Defford have been dismantled, but the central part of the now disused airfield still houses the Satellite Communications facility operated by QinetiQ. The various dishes and aerials used can be seen from passing trains between Worcester and Cheltenham and from the M5 motorway near Strensham services.

== Current use ==
The airfield site is now owned and used by West Mercia Police as their Police driver training facility, and many of the "golf balls" and other communications equipment have been removed. Some of the station buildings remain in other uses. A few are contained within the National Trust property of Croome, including part of the station’s medical facilities, which now house the RAF Defford museum. Light aviation can refer to the nearby Croft Farm Airstrip.

== Accidents and incidents ==
The worst accident in the history of the unit happened on 7 June 1942, when Handley Page Halifax V9977 crashed, with the loss of all eleven crew and scientists on board, including Alan Blumlein. It had been testing the new H2S radar system that used the cavity magnetron valve developed by TRE. In 2002, exactly sixty years later, an RAF Defford Memorial was unveiled by Sir Bernard Lovell on the village green of Defford. It commemorates those who lost their lives in accidents while carrying out scientific research. It reads:

"Dedicated to the memory of those Royal Air Force Air Crew, Scientists, Engineers and Civilian Personnel who lost their lives in the furtherance of Radar Research while flying with The Telecommunications Flying Unit (TFU) later the Radar Research Flying Unit (RRFU) from RAF Defford 1941–1957 REQUIESCANT IN PACE"

== See also ==
- Telecommunications Research Establishment
- List of former Royal Air Force stations
- MERLIN
- Village Inn (codename)
