= QinetiQ Pershore =

- IATA: none; ICAO: none

Summary
- Owner: QinetiQ
- Opened: 1978
- Elevation AMSL: 121 ft / 37 m
- Coordinates: 52°08′33″N 2°2′11″W

Map
- Shown within Worcestershire

Runways
Direction	Length		Surface
Direction	ft	m	Surface
00/00	0	0	Concrete

QinetiQ Pershore is a Business Park and Trials Centre operated by QinetiQ. The site is located near the village of Throckmorton, Worcestershire, England.

== History ==
The site was created during 1933/4 for use by the Royal Air Force as a training station under the name of RAF Pershore.

The following units were posted here at some point:

- No. 1 Aircraft Preparation Unit RAF
- No. 1 Ferry Unit RAF
- No. 10 (Advanced) Flying Training School RAF
- No. 23 Operational Training Unit RAF with Vickers Wellingtons.
- No. 50 Gliding School RAF
- No. 1516 (Beam Approach Training) Flight RAF
- No. 1681 (Bomber) Defence Training Flight RAF
- Radar Research Flying Unit RAF (RRFU). - previously at RAF Defford

The RAF station closed down during 1978.

== Current use ==
The site is currently a Business Park and Trials Centre.

It has occasionally been opened as an aerodrome, hosting an airshow. The last such event was scheduled for 11 June 2016.
