= DZ203 =

Test aircraft

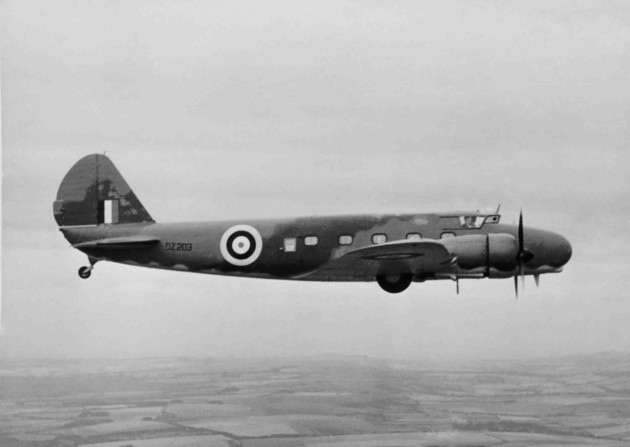
DZ203 in RAF service.

DZ203, a Boeing 247 airliner, was among the most important single aircraft used in the development of various airborne radar and blind-landing systems. It is particularly notable as the first aircraft to perform a completely automatic approach and landing, in January 1945.

The aircraft was originally built in 1933 as construction number 1726 and entered service with United Airlines as NC13344. United later sold off their fleet of 247's, and NC13344 was part of a set of eight that was purchased by the Royal Canadian Air Force (RCAF) on 10 August 1940 for light transport duties. NC13344 arrived at RCAF Station Dartmouth in September, where it was registered as RCAF serial number 7655.

In August 1940, during the Tizard Mission, the Canadian National Research Council (NRC) was introduced to the British work on radars. The mission continued on to Washington, DC, where the cavity magnetron was revealed and US agreed to build versions of the AI Mk. VIII radar. Their initial SCR-520 sets were too large for British night fighters, so the NRC donated 7655 to the UK for testing these systems. It was sent across the Atlantic in pieces in July 1941 and reassembled and registered as DZ203, flying out of RAF Hurn. It moved to RAF Defford in May 1942, and in July it was declared top secret for tests of a new US X band air-to-surface-vessel radar.

Declared obsolete on 19 September 1943, DZ203 was instead transferred to the blind-landing research team. It underwent a complete rebuild, and on 16 January 1945 performed its first automated landing, following this in February with the world's first completely blind automatic approach and landing. It remained in service with the blind-landing unit until 1946 when it was struck from the list, and scrapped in July 1947.

== United Airlines ==
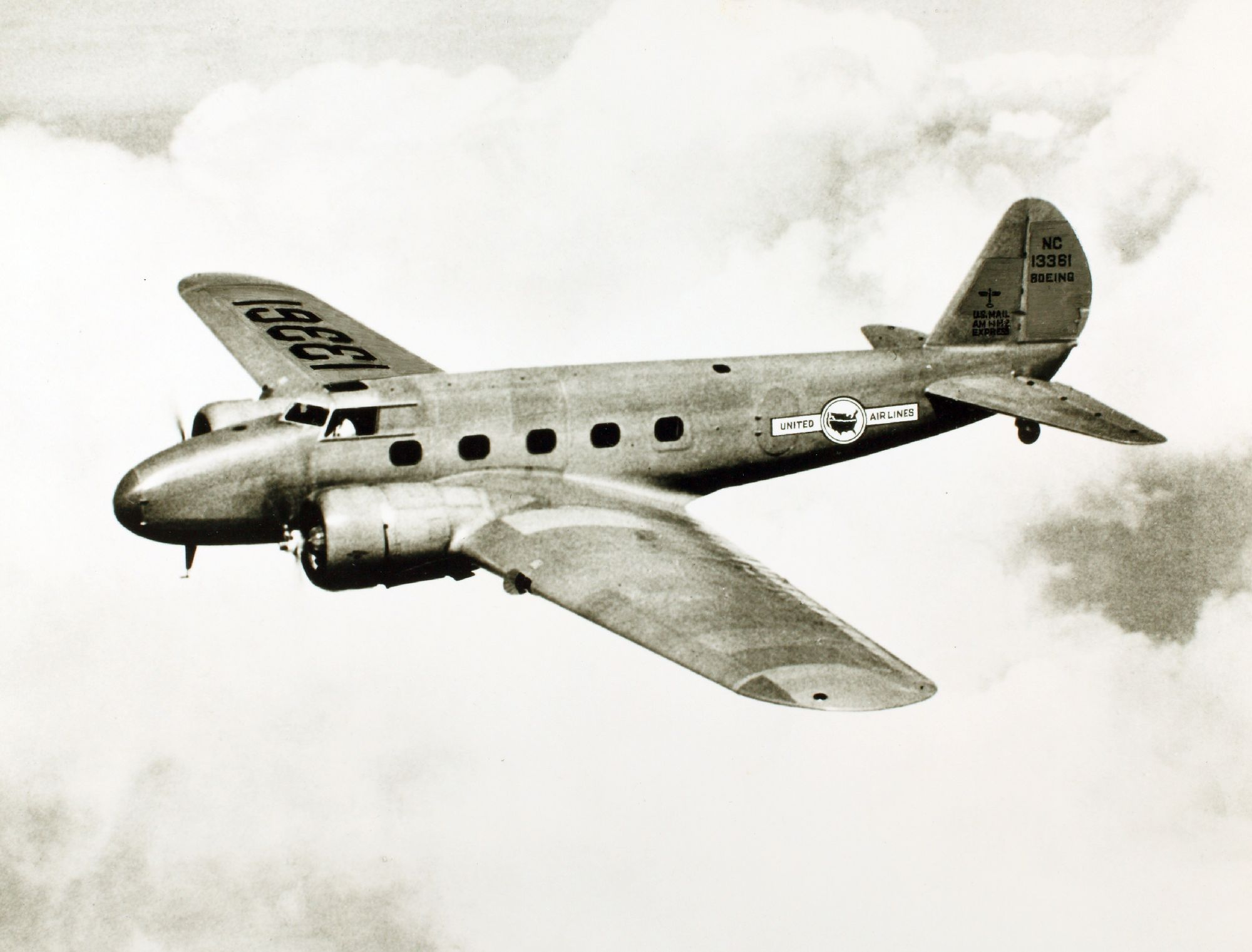
During its United Airlines service, NC13344 would have appeared almost identical to N13361 seen here.

Widely regarded as the first modern airliner, the Boeing 247 flew in February 1933 and was the centerpiece of Boeing's display at the 1933 World's Fair in Chicago. It was the first design to combine all-metal construction, a low-mounted cantilever wing, fully retracting landing gear and an autopilot. The largest order was from Boeing's own Boeing Air Transport and the second for the Boeing-Pratt & Whitney partnership, United Aircraft and Transport Corporation. DZ203 was part of this batch, construction number 1726, and went into service with United as NC13344. After the 1934 Air Mail scandal, these companies were broken up and those aircraft became part of the newly forming United Air Lines.

The 247's design had been compromised by pilot comments, a number of whom suggested building a plane with the 550 hp Pratt & Whitney Wasp engine rather than the 700 hp Pratt & Whitney Hornet that had originally been selected. They felt the Hornet would be too powerful for pilots used to the much less powerful engines of the era. This required the entire design to be scaled down, leaving an opening in the market for other companies to use larger engines and offer more seating and resulting in more economical operation. The introduction of Douglas DC-2 in 1934 immediately rendered the 247 design outdated, and the 1935 Douglas DC-3 sealed its fate. Boeing's rush to design a similar aircraft, the Model 280, went nowhere.

The introduction of the DC-2 immediately led to losses for United. In the first six months of 1934 they carried 43.7% of all US traffic, but in the second half of the year, with the introduction of the DC-2, that fell to 37.9%. In an attempt to address this, the aircraft were featured in a series of advertisements, races and movies, but by the start of World War II with even larger aircraft on the books, United began selling the fleet. A large purchase was made by the US Army Air Corps as the C-73, while many others entered service with smaller airlines.

== Canadian service ==
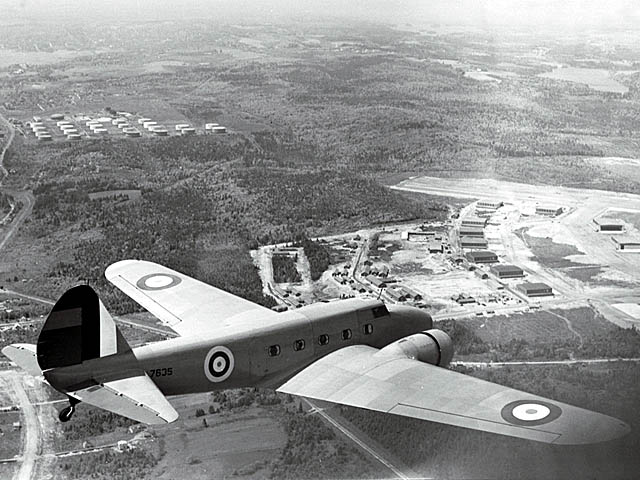
RCAF 7635 operated alongside 7655 from RCAF Station Dartmouth, seen on the right side of this image.

NC13344 was part of a purchase of eight 247D's made by the Canadian Department of Munitions and Supply between June and October 1940. The design was not well received; two were sent to RCAF Detachment Malton where managers of No. 1 Air Observer School wrote that "After careful inspection and thought we have rendered our reports and put them at the back of the hangars in the hope that a garbage remover will take them away some day."

NC13344 was purchased on 10 August, and received the civilian registration CF-BTA for the duration of the ferry flight. (Note: Not CF-TBA, as is found in some references. TBA was a Beech 18, RCAF 1458. CF-BTA is currently registered to a Cessna T-50 Crane.) It was then sent to RCAF Station Dartmouth where it received RCAF tail number 7655 and was officially added to the register on 11 September 1940. In Canadian service, the aircraft was part of No. 121 Squadron RCAF, which operated a wide variety of aircraft including the 247's, Grumman Goose, Westland Lysander, Avro Anson, Noorduyn Norseman, Bristol Bolingbroke and Lockheed Hudson. (Note: There is some confusion which squadron the aircraft was part of; there were a number of mergers and moves during this period that confuse matters. It is possible that the aircraft left Canada before the "final" version of No. 121 formed up. Details are on the No. 121 squadron site.)

While NC13344 was arriving, a group of scientists from the United Kingdom formed what is today known as the Tizard Mission to introduce researchers in the US to the advances in electronics being made in the UK. Among these devices was the cavity magnetron, which US historian James Phinney Baxter III later described in his Pulitzer Prize winning book as "the most valuable cargo ever brought to our shores". Henry Tizard and F. L. Pearce flew to Montreal on 14 August aboard Short Empire Clair and travelled to Ottawa the next day for meetings with researchers at the Canadian National Research Council to have them make introductions with the US. Meetings in Washington, DC began on 10 September and were joined by a Canadian group on 12 September. Taffy Bowen finally revealed the cavity magnetron on the 19th.

Among the many other devices brought to the US by the Mission was the older AI Mk. IV radar, the first production air-to-air radar for night fighters. US companies were able to put this into production almost immediately, awaiting the availability of more advanced units based on the magnetron. Units purchased by the UK were first routed to Canada, and to test these in the air, 7655 was selected as an airborne testbed. When the first example of a US magnetron radar arrived, it was the enormous SCR-520, which was too large to fit in any contemporary British night fighter. The RCAF test-fit the system in 7655, and when this was found to be successful, offered the aircraft to the United Kingdom's Royal Air Force (RAF). For this role it was particularly useful due to the luggage area in the nose being large enough for the radar scanner and easily accessed.

== Radar testing ==
7655 was disassembled and shipped in crates to the Liverpool Docks, where it arrived on 27 July 1941. It was reassembled at nearby RAF Speke (on the grounds of today's Liverpool John Lennon Airport) and given the RAF serial number (tail code) DZ203. It flew for the first time in the UK on 2 August, with Flight Lieutenant Frank Griffiths at the controls, who had been sent to collect the aircraft on behalf of the Special Duty Flight. The Special Duty Flight operated test flights on behalf of the Telecommunications Research Establishment (TRE), the deliberately oddly-named unit within the Ministry of Aviation responsible for the development of radar. This unit was renamed the Telecommunications Flying Unit (TFU) in November 1941.

DZ203 was initially tested at RAF Christchurch and RAF Hurn, near the TREs various units spread around the Swanage area near Poole Harbour on the south coast of England. The Ministry grew alarmed at the possibility of a German commando raid against the research facilities, (Note: This appears to have been premature; there is no historical evidence the Germans were aware of their existence, let alone their location.) and in May 1942 the TRE was hurriedly moved to Malvern College, whilst the TFU moved to nearby RAF Defford. DZ203 arrived on 23 May and continued testing AI radars.

On 10 July the Ministry of Aircraft Production issued a note ordering that DZ203 would be used as the testbed for a new US radar design, an X band Air-to-Surface Vessel radar, or ASV. ASV radars were able to detect boats and surfaced submarines at long distance, but struggled against smaller targets including a semi-submerged submarine with just its conning tower above water. Newer ASV designs operating at shorter wavelengths, 3 cm in the case of the X band, offered higher resolution from the same antenna units, allowing them to pick out smaller targets. As this radar was declared top secret, DZ203 was also declared top secret. This meant it had to have an armed guard whenever it was on the ground. Testing of the new radar continued through at least October 1942. In November, DZ203 found itself being used to test a new transponder system, although details are scarce. It continued flying for the next year, and in 1943 was mostly used by the Naval Section of the TFU.

== Auto-landing testing ==
On 19 September 1943, DZ203 was declared obsolete for radar testing and stripped of its top secret rating the next day. It was initially intended to send it to the TFUs Communications Flight, but it was instead picked up to test experimental automatic blind-landing equipment also being developed by the TRE. Of the many aircraft available in the TFU, the 247 had the ideal combination of size and performance to test the system intended for cargo aircraft and bombers.

The experimental system was based on the SCS-51, a blind-landing system introduced by the US in 1942. The SCS-51 formed the basis for the modern instrument landing system (ILS), which offers enough accuracy to bring the aircraft to an altitude of 200 feet (61 m) above the ground. At that "decision height", the runway has to be visible or the pilot aborts the landing. While the system was accurate enough for landing in fairly bad weather, it was not enough for a true auto-land system. To make that work, the TRE team added a radio altimeter to judge the proper time to flare, and a magnetic cable running off the end of the runway to provide accurate lateral guidance along the runway centerline.

By the time the equipment was ready to test, DZ203 was long overdue for an overhaul. Some consideration was given to returning it to the US, but eventually, it was decided to carry this out at Defford. This effort began in July 1944 and took three months and 800 man-hours to complete, returning as the rechristened DZ203/G. The first completely automatic approach and landing was carried out during the day on 16 January 1945, with Griffiths at the controls. (Note: An automated landing had been performed in 1937, but the system on DZ203 automated the entire flight.) The feat was repeated for the first time at night and in heavy fog on the night of 21 February, the first automated blind landing. Tests continued until April when the landing gear failed to extend on landing and the aircraft suffered minor damage. It was repaired and returned to testing.

== Scrapping ==
In 1945, the TRE formed a separate Blind Landing Experimental Unit at RAF Martlesham Heath but there are no records of DZ203 flying there. A 30 October meeting of the Aircraft Establishment Committee at Defford decided to reduce the size of the fleet, and DZ203 was struck from the list. It was ultimately scrapped by Number 34 Maintenance Unit at RAF Sleap in August 1947, reportedly after being damaged in a hangar collapse during a snow storm.
