= HMS Howe (32) =

King George V-class battleship of the Royal Navy

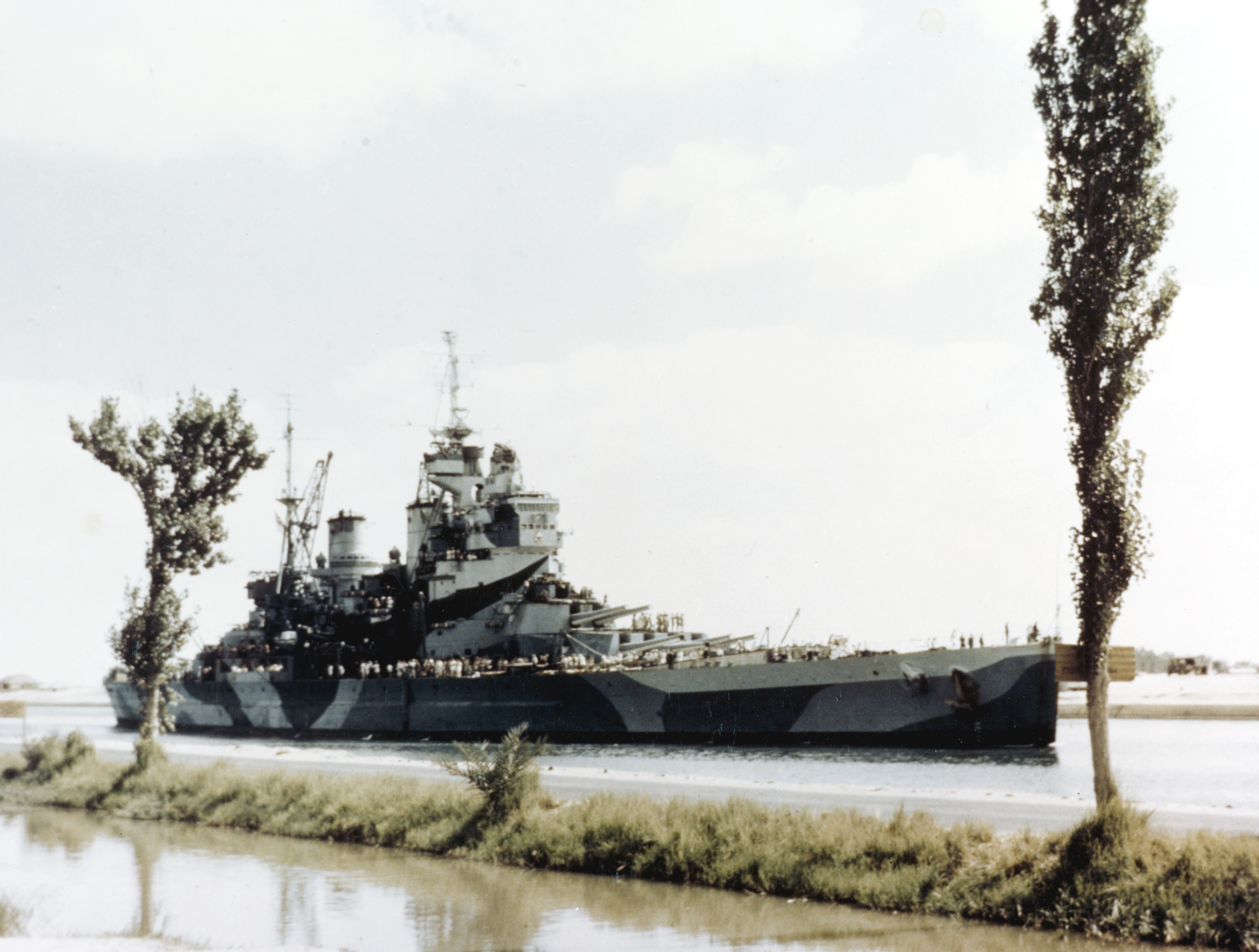
- Howe in the Suez Canal on her way to the Pacific Ocean in July 1944

History

United Kingdom
- Name: HMS Howe
- Ordered: 28 April 1937
- Builder: Fairfield Shipbuilding & Engineering Company, Glasgow, Scotland
- Laid down: 1 June 1937
- Launched: 9 April 1940
- Completed: 31 March 1941
- Commissioned: 29 August 1942
- Decommissioned: 1950
- Identification: Pennant number: 32
- Fate: Scrapped at Inverkeithing in 27 May 1958

General characteristics
- Class & type: King George V-class battleship
- Displacement: 39,150 long tons (39,780 t) standard; 44,510 long tons (45,220 t) full
- Length: 744 feet 11.5 inches (227.1 m) 740 ft 1 in (225.6 m) (waterline)
- Beam: 103 feet (31.4 m)
- Draught: 29 feet 6 inches (9.0 m)
- Installed power: 110,000 shp (82,000 kW)
- Propulsion: 8 Admiralty 3-drum small-tube boilers; 4 sets Parsons geared turbines
- Speed: 28.3 knots (52.4 km/h; 32.6 mph)
- Range: 5,350–6,000 nmi (9,910–11,110 km; 6,160–6,900 mi) at 14 knots (26 km/h; 16 mph)
- Complement: 1,521 (1941)
- Sensors & processing systems: Type 274 radar; Type 282 radar; Type 283 radar; Type 273 radar; Type 281 radar
- Armament: 10 × BL 14-inch (356 mm) Mark VII; 16 × QF 5.25-inch (133 mm) Mk. I; 48 × QF 2 pdr 1.575-inch (40.0 mm) Mk.VIII; 18 × 20 mm (0.8 in) Oerlikon AA guns
- Armour: Main belt: 14.7 inches (370 mm); Lower belt: 5.4 inches (140 mm); Deck: 5–6 inches (127–152 mm); Main turrets: 12.75 inches (324 mm); Barbettes: 12.75 inches (324 mm); Bulkheads: 10–12 inches (254–305 mm); Conning tower: 3–4 inches (76–102 mm).
- Aircraft carried: 4 Supermarine Walrus seaplanes, 1 double-ended catapult

HMS Howe (pennant number 32) was the last of the five British King George V-class battleships of the Royal Navy. Built by Fairfield Shipbuilding & Engineering Company, Glasgow she was laid down on 1 June 1937 and launched 9 April 1940. She was originally to have been named Beatty but this was changed to Howe, after Admiral Richard Howe.

Howe was completed on 29 August 1942 after her building time was extended, as supplies were diverted to work of a higher priority such as the construction and repair of merchant ships and escort ships. Like her sister-ship HMS Anson, Howe spent most of her career in the Arctic Ocean providing cover for Russian convoys.

In 1943, Howe took part in Operation Husky and bombarded Trapani naval base and Favignana in support of the Allied landings. Along with King George V, Howe escorted two surrendered Italian battleships to Alexandria. Howe was also sent to the Pacific Ocean and attached to the British Pacific Fleet (Task Force 113), where she provided naval bombardments for the Allied landings at Okinawa on 1 April 1945.

After the war, Howe spent four years as flagship of the Training Squadron at Portland, before she was placed in reserve in 1950. The battleship was sold for scrap in 1958 and broken up by 1961.

== Construction ==
In the aftermath of World War I, the Washington Naval Treaty was drawn up in 1922 in an effort to stop an arms race from developing among Britain, Japan, France, Italy and the United States. This treaty limited the number of ships each nation was allowed to build and capped the tonnage of all capital ships at 35,000 tons. These restrictions were extended in 1930 through the Treaty of London, however, by the mid-1930s Japan and Italy had withdrawn from both of these treaties and the British became concerned about a lack of modern battleships within their navy. As a result, the Admiralty ordered the construction of a new battleship class: the King George V class. Due to the provisions of both the Washington Naval Treaty and the Treaty of London, both of which were still in effect when the King George Vs were being designed, the main armament of the class was limited to the 14-inch (356 mm) guns prescribed under these instruments. They were the only battleships built at that time to adhere to the treaty and even though it soon became apparent to the British that the other signatories to the treaty were ignoring its requirements, it was too late to change the design of the class before they were laid down in 1937.

The keel of Howe, the last ship of the King George V class, was laid on 1 June 1937 at the Fairfield Shipyard in Govan. She was originally to have been named HMS Beatty, after Admiral David Beatty, commander of the British battlecruiser squadron at the Battle of Jutland, but the name was changed to HMS Howe, after Admiral Richard Howe. Howe was launched on 9 April 1940 and completed on 20 August 1942. She carried improved anti-aircraft armament and radar equipment as a result of lessons already learned in World War II.

== Design ==
Howe displaced 39,150 long tons (39,780 t) as built and 44,510 long tons (45,220 t) fully loaded. She had an overall length of 744 feet 11.5 inches (227.1 m), a beam of 103 feet (31.4 m) and a draught of 29 feet 6 inches (9.0 m). Her designed metacentric height was 6 feet 1 inch (1.85 m) at normal load and 8 feet 1 inch (2.46 m) at deep load.

The ship was powered by Parsons geared steam turbines, driving four propeller shafts. Steam was provided by eight Admiralty 3-drum water-tube boilers, which normally delivered 100,000 shaft horsepower (75,000 kW) but could produce 110,000 shp (82,000 kW) at emergency overload. (Note: The King George V-class battleships had their steam plant specifications revised during the building phase, and as built the ships actually delivered 110,000 shp (82,000 kW) at 230 rpm, and were designed for an overload power of 125,000 shp (93,000 kW), which was exceeded in service.) This gave Howe a top speed of 27.62 knots (51.15 km/h; 31.78 mph). The ship carried 4,210 long tons (4,300 t) of fuel oil. She also carried 183 long tons (200 t) of diesel oil, 262 long tons (300 t) of reserve feed water and 442 long tons (400 t) of freshwater. At full speed Howe had a range of 2,600 nautical miles (4,800 km; 3,000 mi) at 27 knots (50 km/h; 31 mph).

=== Armament ===
Howe mounted 10 BL 14-inch (356 mm) Mk VII guns. The 14-inch guns were mounted in one Mark II twin turret forward and two Mark III quadruple turrets, one forward and one aft. The guns could be elevated 40 degrees and depressed 3 degrees. Training arcs were: turret "A", 286 degrees; turret "B", 270 degrees; turret "Y", 270 degrees. Training and elevating was done by hydraulic drives, with rates of two and eight degrees per second, respectively. A full gun broadside weighed 15,950 pounds (7,230 kg), and a salvo could be fired every 40 seconds. The secondary armament consisted of 16 QF 5.25-inch (133 mm) Mk I guns which were mounted in eight twin mounts, weighing 81 tons each. The maximum range of the Mk I guns was 24,070 yd (22,010 m) at 45 degrees with HE shell at 2,672 ft/s (814 m/s), the anti-aircraft ceiling was 49,000 feet (14,935.2 m). The guns could be elevated to 70 degrees and depressed to 5 degrees. The nominal rate of fire was ten to twelve rounds per minute, but in practice the guns could only fire seven to eight rounds per minute. Upon commissioning, along with her main and secondary batteries, Howe carried 48 QF 2 pdr 1.575-inch (40.0 mm) Mk.VIII "pom-pom" anti-aircraft guns and 18 20 mm (0.8 in) Oerlikon AA guns

== Operational history ==
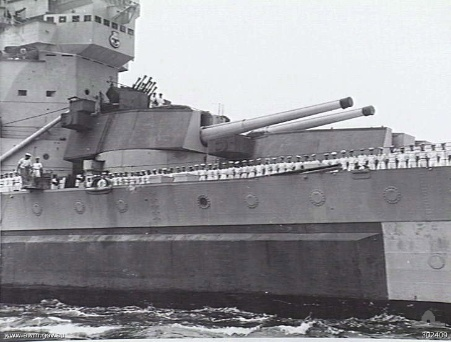
Howe's "B" turret in Sydney in 1944

=== Home Fleet ===
Howe joined the Home Fleet on 30 August 1942, her building time extended, owing to more urgent demands of the industry. Like her sister ship Anson, she spent the early years of her combat career in Arctic waters, covering convoys bound for Russia. On 31 December 1942, Howe and her sister ship King George V provided distant cover for convoy RA 51, which safely arrived in Loch Ewe on 9 January 1943. Howe and King George V also provided distant cover for convoy RA 53 on 1 March 1943 and helped to recover merchantmen whose ships had been sunk. In 1943 Howe was transferred to Gibraltar with King George V to take part in Operation Husky, the Allied invasion of Sicily; the US battleships Alabama and South Dakota substituted for their absence from the Home Fleet. The two British ships shelled Trapani naval base and Favignana during 11–12 July. Based in Algiers, the pair also offered cover during Operation Avalanche—the Allied landings at Salerno—setting out on 7 September. On 14 September Howe and King George V escorted the surrendered Italian battleships Vittorio Veneto and Italia to Alexandria.

By the end of October 1943, Howe and King George V had returned to Britain. At the end of year, Howe underwent a long overhaul at Devonport, where a number of alterations were made. Her anti-aircraft armament was increased, changes were made to her radar, and her watertight integrity in the stern was improved. Modifications were accomplished in the officers and crew quarters for operations in tropical climates; these included changes in insulation, and the extensive use of air-conditioning equipment.

=== Pacific operations ===
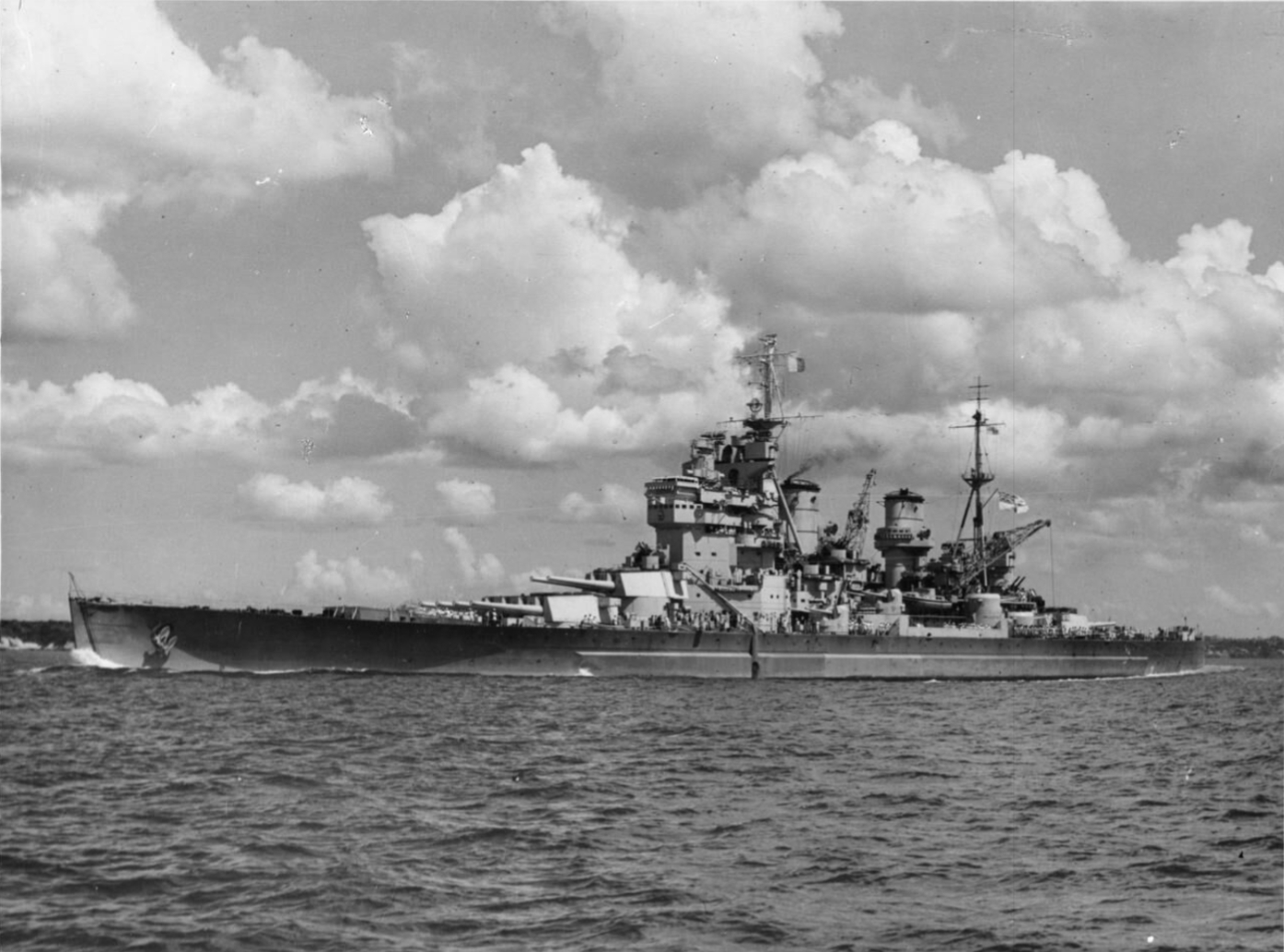
Howe in Auckland in 1945

On 8 August 1944, Howe arrived at Trincomalee in Ceylon to join the Eastern Fleet. She was the first modern British battleship to be deployed in eastern waters since the loss of Prince of Wales in December 1941. Howe was put into action quickly, providing cover for carrier based air operations against targets in Sumatra. In December she moved to Sydney, where she sailed to Auckland, New Zealand, to show the flag. In February 1945, Howe and King George V sailed from Sydney to begin operations in earnest in the Pacific theatre; together with four carriers, five cruisers and fifteen destroyers, they made up Task Force 113.

The first major undertaking for Task Force 113 (now redesignated TF.57) was Operation Iceberg—offshore support for the US landings at Okinawa—which got under way on 1 April 1945. The force was subjected to sporadic Japanese kamikaze attacks, but the two ships emerged unscathed from these actions. Howe's anti-aircraft batteries also succeeded in shooting down an attacking kamikaze plane. The two ships' principal roles were air defence and land bombardment, the latter being carried out very accurately, particularly by Howe against anti-aircraft installations on the island of Miyako, half way between Okinawa and Formosa.

=== Post-war activity ===
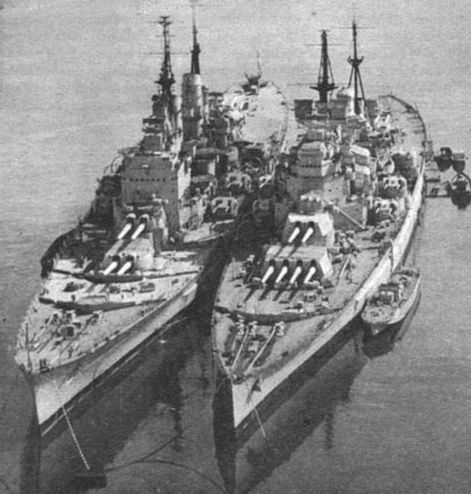
Howe (right), and Vanguard in reserve at Devonport in 1956

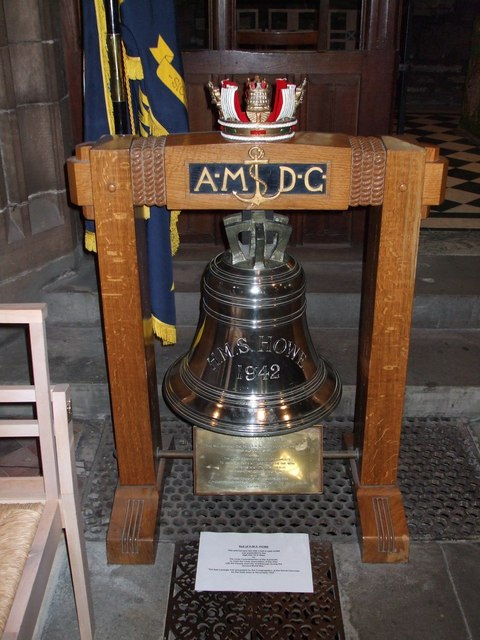
HMS Howe's bell in St Giles' Cathedral, Edinburgh

By the first week of June 1945, Howe was back in Sydney, and almost immediately it was decided to send her for a refit in Durban. It was here that she saw out the remainder of the war. She was relocated back to Portsmouth by January 1946. In 1951, Howe was placed in reserve and towed to Devonport. She was ordered scrapped in 1957, as she and other battleships were increasingly deemed to have been made obsolete by aircraft and no longer needed as a defence against Soviet cruisers. On 27 May 1958, Howe was towed to Inverkeithing to be broken up by Thos W Ward. The Royal Navy presented the ship's bell to St Giles' Cathedral in Edinburgh. In 2012, it was reported that parts from one of the gun turrets may still exist, having been re-used as a turntable at Dounreay nuclear laboratory.

== Refits ==
During her career, Howe was refitted on several occasions to bring her equipment up to date:

| Dates | Location | Description of Work |
|---|---|---|
| March 1943 | | 22 × single 20mm added |
| December 1943 – May 1944 | Devonport | 6 × single 20mm Oerlikons removed, 2 × 4-barreled 40mm Bofors added, 2 × 8-barreled 2-pdr pom-pom added, 4 × twin 20mm added, aircraft facilities removed, Type 274, 282 and 283 radar added and Type 273, 281 and 284 radar removed |
| 29 June – September 1945 | Durban | 34 × single 20mm Oerlikons removed, 6 × 4-barreled 2-pdr added and 18 × single 40mm Bofors added |
| Late 1945 | | 6 × single 40mm Bofors removed |
| 21 January – 14 March 1946 | Portsmouth | 6 × 4-barreled 2-pdr added, 8 × single 40mm Bofors removed |
| May 1948 – June 1949 | Devonport | 2 × 4-barreled 40mm Bofors removed |

== Artefacts ==
A large model of HMS Howe, from her builder around the time she was laid down, is on display in the Riverside Museum in Glasgow.
