= Guptill =

Guptill is a surname. Notable people with the surname include:

- Ernest Wilmot Guptill (1919–1976), Canadian physicist
- Martin Guptill (born 1986), New Zealand cricketer
- Michael Guptill-Bunce (born 1989), New Zealand cricketer, cousin of Martin
- Nancy Guptill (1941–2020), Canadian politician
- Scott D. Guptill (1889–1949), Canadian politician
- Stephen Guptill, American journalist and elderly advocate

== See also ==
- Watson-Guptill, American publisher of instructional books in the arts
