= List of World War II British naval radar =

This page is a List of World War II British naval radar.

== Nomenclature ==
These sets were initially numbered as wireless telegraph (w/t) sets, but a distinguishing prefix of "2" was soon added. Metric sets were numbered in the 28x and 29x series. When centimetric sets arrived with the advent of the cavity magnetron, they were numbered by subtracting 10 from the metric type number they were based on (e.g. the metric Type 284 was replaced by the centimetric Type 274). This was not always possible however, as Types 271 - 274 were already in use for original centimetric sets, thus some metric sets in the Type 28x range had 20 subtracted (e.g. the metric Type 282 was replaced by the centimetric Type 262). Aerial outfits were given a three letter identifier that began with "A".

Suffixing letters indicated the following;

- B - conversion of sets with separate transmitting (Tx) and receiving (Rx) antennas to single antenna operation.
- M, P, Q - major set modifications
- R - addition of range-taking panel
- U - modification to suit coastal operations
- W - modification to submarine use
- X, Y, Z - experimental modifications

== Sets ==
=== ASV II ===
Type	Aerial outfit	Peak power (kW)	Frequency (MHz)	Wavelength (mm)	In service
ASV Mark I/Mark II		7	176	1700	1940

The first successful air-to-surface-vessel (ASV) radar, from early 1940. ASV II was a re-packaged ASV I but otherwise similar. ASV II radar allowed Fleet Air Arm (FAA) Swordfish from the carriers Victorious and Ark Royal to locate and attack the German battleship Bismarck in May 1941.

=== ASV III ===
Type	Aerial outfit	Peak power (kW)	Frequency (MHz)	Wavelength (mm)	In service
ASV III/XI		50	3000	100	1943

The first successful airborne microwave radar. Used on FAA Swordfish and Barracuda aircraft, and many RAF Coastal Command aircraft. High-resolution centimetric radar could detect even small objects, such as the periscope or snorkel of a submerged submarine, making it a highly efficient tool for Anti-submarine warfare (ASW). The Mk XI was a further development exclusively for the FAA.

=== Type 79 ===
Type	Aerial outfit	Peak power (kW)	Frequency (MHz)	Wavelength (mm)	In service
79		70	42.8	7,000	1938

Based on the Type 79 w/t, first fitted to Sheffield then Rodney and later Curlew; (40 sets ordered)

=== Type 86 ===
Type	Aerial outfit	Peak power (kW)	Frequency (MHz)	Wavelength (mm)	In service
86M	APH				1962

Fore-runner to Type 286.

=== Type 262 ===
Type	Aerial outfit	Peak power (kW)	Frequency (MHz)	Wavelength (mm)	In service
262	APE	30	9,670	31	

Centimetric fire-control set for 40 mm Bofors weapons. Fitted to Close Range Blind Fire (CRBF) director and STAAG weapon mount. Dish antenna spun off-centre at high speed to produce scanning cone, target lock and blind fire possible.

=== Type 267 ===
Type	Aerial outfit	Peak power (kW)	Frequency (MHz)	Wavelength (mm)	In service
267	APT	100	214	1,400	

Air warning set for submarines replacing Type 291W.

=== Type 268 ===
Type	Aerial outfit	Peak power (kW)	Frequency (MHz)	Wavelength (mm)	In service
268	AQN	40	9,386	32	

First X band naval radar. Used on small vessels for target indication and navigation.

=== Type 271 ===
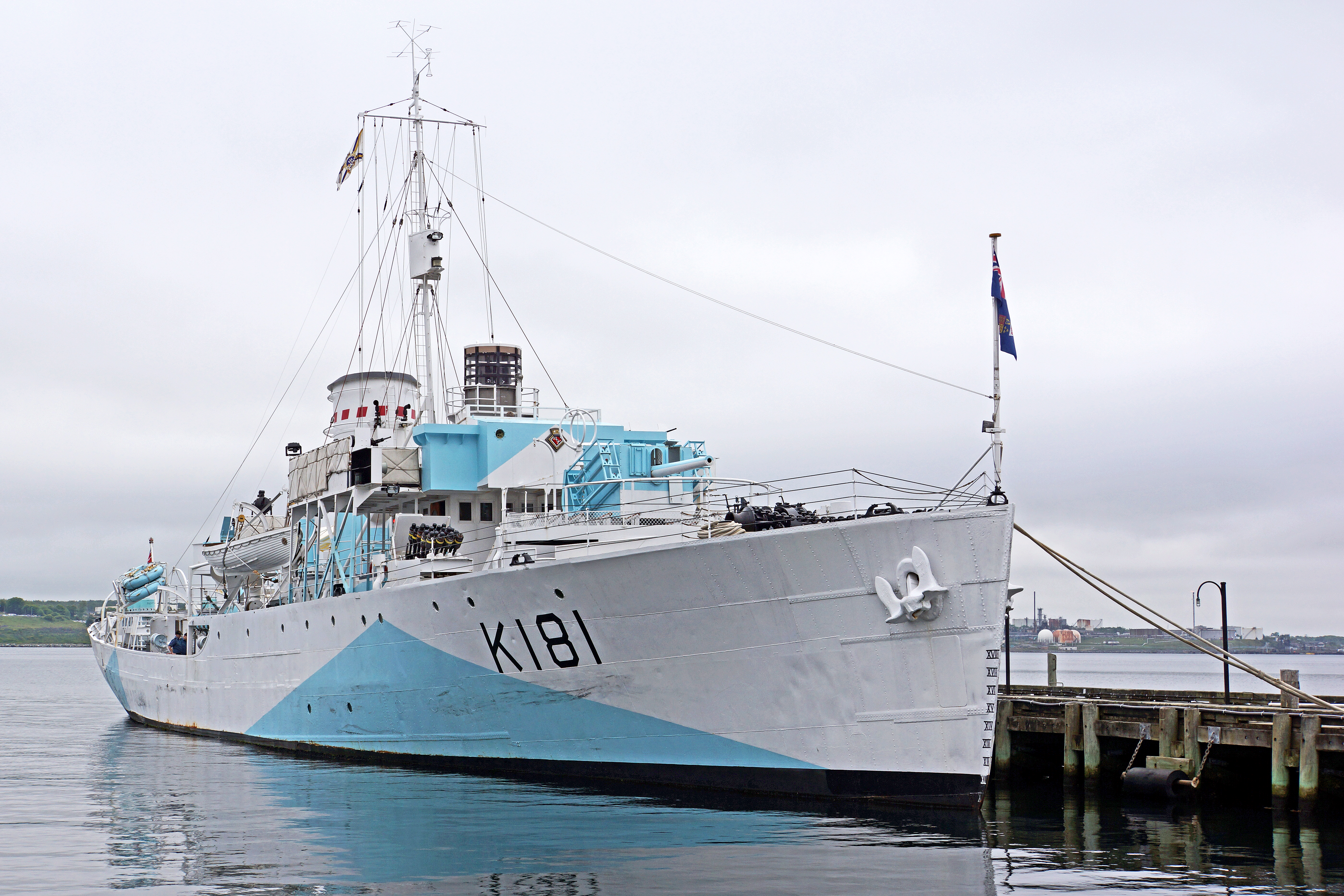
Type 271 on top of the bridge of HMCS Sackville. This fitting has the original "lantern" style radome that was replaced beginning in 1943.

Type	Aerial outfit	Peak power (kW)	Frequency (MHz)	Wavelength (mm)	In service
271		5	2,997	100	March 1941
271P		90	2,997	100	1943
271Q		90	2,997	100	1943

Type 271 was the original naval centimetric target indication radar, later fitted with a plan position indicator. Type 271 had separate transmit and receive aerials, small "cheese" antennas stacked on top of each other. The antenna array was carried in a distinctive protective perspex "lantern", and initially had to be fitted directly onto the radar office roof due to limitations in coaxial cabling (until suitable waveguides had been developed). The Type 271 was a vitally important war weapon, as for the first time it allowed escort ships to reliably detect surfaced U-boats or even just their periscopes. It was first fitted in HMS Orchis. 350 sets were ordered. Modification Q was much more powerful and known as the "Centimetric Mark IV". Mark V was even more powerful and later renamed Type 277. Type 271 was fitted widely to escort vessels of corvette and frigate size, with the unsuccessful Type 272 intended for destroyers and the Type 273 for cruisers and battleships.

=== Type 272 ===
Type	Aerial outfit	Peak power (kW)	Frequency (MHz)	Wavelength (mm)	In service
272		90	2,997	100	1941

A version of the Type 271 with a cable-drive and more powerful receiver allowing the antenna to be mounted remotely from the radar office. Was not considered successful and not widely used.

=== Type 273 ===
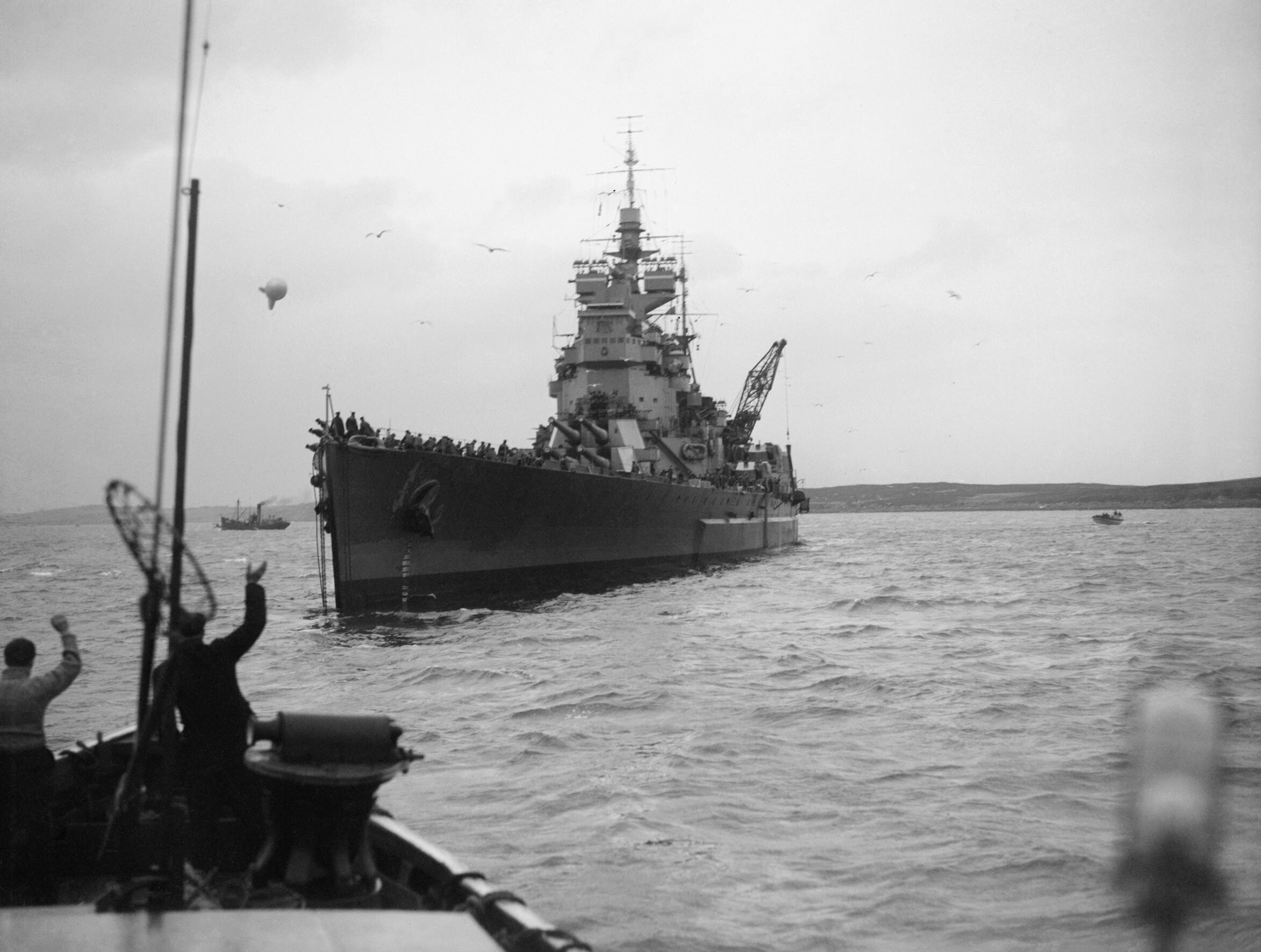
HMS Duke of York returns from her battle with Scharnhorst. The 273Q can be seen near the top of the mast.

Type	Aerial outfit	Peak power (kW)	Frequency (MHz)	Wavelength (mm)	In service
273	AQN	90	2,997	100	1941

A version of the 271 with a much larger 3 foot (0.91 m) diameter full-parabolic antennas instead of the smaller clipped "cheese" antennas of the 271. The antennas were mounted on a stabilized mounting and placed high on the mast on cruiser and battleship sized ships. The larger antennas more than made up for the wiring losses seen in the 272, and the resulting system was even more powerful than the original 271. Upgrades followed those of the original 271 series. In the Battle of the North Cape, HMS Duke of York identified the target of Scharnhorst at 45,000 yards (41,000 m) using her Type 273 set, receiving a solid signal on the Scharnhorst's mast while the ship was still well below the radar horizon. Replaced by the Type 276.

=== Type 274 ===
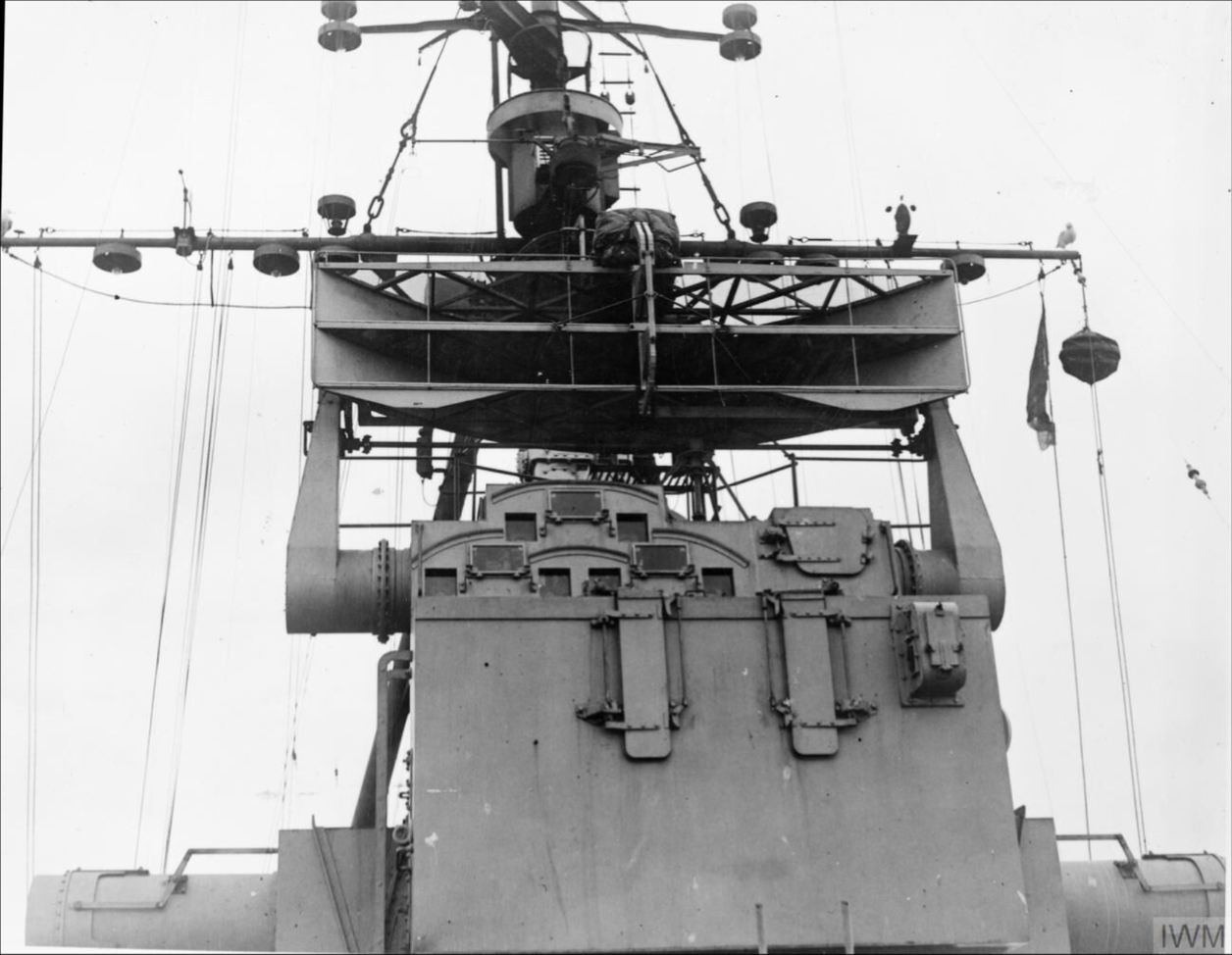
Main Armament Fire Control Radar Set equipped with a 274 aerial on board HMS Swiftsure, a Minotaur-class class cruiser, at Scapa Flow.

Type	Aerial outfit	Peak power (kW)	Frequency (MHz)	Wavelength (mm)	In service
274	AUM	500	3,294	91	1944

Centimetric replacement for Type 284. Main armament ranging and shot-spotting set for cruisers and battleships. "Double cheese" antennas. Most notably in place on HMS Belfast

=== Type 275 ===
Type	Aerial outfit	Peak power (kW)	Frequency (MHz)	Wavelength (mm)	In service
275		400	3,526	85	1944

Centimetric replacement for Type 285. Destroyer main armament and capital ship secondary fire control set. Fitted to directors HACS Mark VI and Mark 6M and modified American Mark 37. Separate Tx and Rx dishes.

=== Type 276 ===
Type	Aerial outfit	Peak power (kW)	Frequency (MHz)	Wavelength (mm)	In service
276	AUS / AUJ	500	2,997	100	1944

Combined the electronics of the Type 277 and the stabilized mounting of the Type 273. Reduced 4-foot (1.2 m) antennas in aerial outfit AUS.

=== Type 277 ===
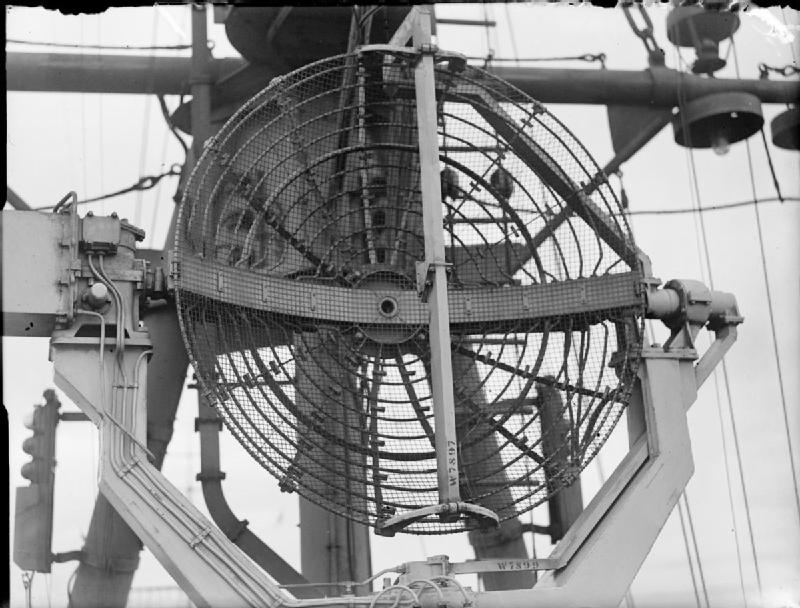
A general surface search Radar set with a Type 277 aerial fitted to HMS Swiftsure at Scapa Flow.

Type	Aerial outfit	Peak power (kW)	Frequency (MHz)	Wavelength (mm)	In service
277P	AUK	400	2,997	100	1943
277Q	ANU	500	2,997	100	1944

Originally known as Type 271 Mark V, this was a significant improvement on the original design and was later renamed to make this clear. Used a single transmit/receive antenna, waveguides instead of coaxial cables and a much more powerful magnetron that considerably improved all-around performance. Aerial Outfit AUK was a parabolic dish, ANU was a cropped paraboloid. Fitted on a "nodding" mount, often used as a height finding set. Superseded in service by Type 278 height finder in County-class destroyers.

=== Type 279 ===
Type	Aerial outfit	Peak power (kW)	Frequency (MHz)	Wavelength (mm)	In service
279		70	39.9	7,450	1940
279M		70	39.9	7,450	1941

Follow on from Type 79, metric air warning set. Had separate Tx and Rx antennas, combined in Type 279M to single antenna operation. This set also had a secondary surface search with surface and aerial gunnery capability and used a Precision Ranging Panel, which passed accurate radar ranges directly to the HACS table (analogue computer).

=== Type 280 ===
Type	Aerial outfit	Peak power (kW)	Frequency (MHz)	Wavelength (mm)	In service
280		25	85	3,500	1940

Metric air warning set with separate Tx / Rx antennas. Based upon Army GL Mark I set, fitted to C-class cruisers converted to anti-aircraft ships. This set used a Precision Ranging Panel, which passed accurate radar ranges directly to the HACS table (analogue computer).

=== Type 281 ===
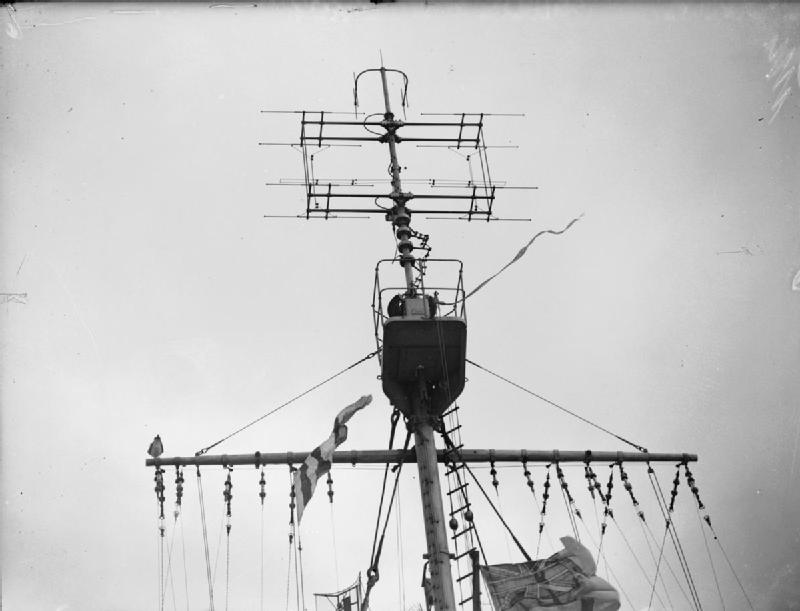
281 B Aerial on board HMS Swiftsure at Scapa Flow.

Type	Aerial outfit	Peak power (kW)	Frequency (MHz)	Wavelength (mm)	In service
281	AQB	350	85	3,500	1940

Metric air warning set with separate Tx / Rx antennas. Type 281B had combined Tx / Rx antenna. First fitted to HMS Dido then HMS Prince of Wales This set also had a secondary surface search function along with aerial and surface gunnery capability and used a Precision Ranging Panel. The Type 281 ranging system allowed the user to select either a 2,000 to 14,000 yd (1,800 to 12,800 m) or a 2,000 to 25,000 yd (1,800 to 22,900 m) range display with range accuracies of 50 or 75 yd (46 or 69 m) RMS, respectively. Aerial target ranges were passed directly to the HACS table (fire control computer).

=== Type 282 ===
Type	Aerial outfit	Peak power (kW)	Frequency (MHz)	Wavelength (cm)	In service
282		25	600	50	1941

Decimetric (50 cm) ranging set for Bofors 40 mm and "multiple pom-pom" fire control. Fitted on Bofors mounting Mark IV "Hazemeyer" and "Pom-pom Director Mk IV", twin Yagi antennas. Type 282 used a mechanical ranging panel and a 0-5000yd display. Type 282M increased transmission power to 150 kW, used a 0 - 6000yd display and introduced Beam Switching, while Type 282P introduced a Precision Ranging Panel.

=== Type 283 ===
Type	Aerial outfit	Peak power (kW)	Frequency (MHz)	Wavelength (cm)	In service
283		25	600	50	1942

Main armament anti-aircraft barrage fire control set fitted to "barrage director" for cruiser 6-inch (150 mm) and battleship guns. This set used a Precision Ranging Panel and was used to fire the guns automatically using the Automatic Barrage Unit.

=== Type 284 ===
Type	Aerial outfit	Peak power (kW)	Frequency (MHz)	Wavelength (cm)	In service
284	ASF	25	600	50	1940
284M	ASF	150	600	50	1941
284P	ASF	150	600	50	1942

Main armament ranging and shot-spotting set for cruisers and battleships with lobe switching beginning with Type 284M to increase accuracy of bearing readings. Prototype fitted on HMS Sardonyx. HMS Southdown received first production set. Used by HMS Suffolk to shadow Bismarck. Type 284P was instrumental in the Battle of the North Cape allowing Duke of York to attack Scharnhorst blind.

=== Type 285 ===
Type	Aerial outfit	Peak power (kW)	Frequency (MHz)	Wavelength (cm)	In service
285		25	600	50	1941
285M		150	600	50	1941
285P		150	600	50	1942

Ranging set for anti-aircraft fire control, fitted to HACS directors and rangefinder-directors and used ranging panel L12. Type 285 with six element Yagi antenna with separate Tx / Rx. Type 285P with five element Yagi antenna with combined Tx / Rx function. The Type 285M could provide accurate ranges via the mechanical ranging panel, L12, and bearing information using lobe switching, but height finding was primitive and had to be calculated using maximum signal indication. As such it could not achieve a target lock, and could not offer blind fire capability. Type 285P introduced a Precision Ranging Panel and had 25yd RMS range accuracy.

=== Type 286 ===
Type	Aerial outfit	Peak power (kW)	Frequency (MHz)	Wavelength (mm)	In service
286M	ATQ		214	1,400	1940

Metric target indication set based upon RAF ASV (Air to Surface Vessel) Mark II set. Type 286M had fixed antennas, with a central Tx and an Rx on either side to give some indication of contact bearing. The antennas were fixed, scanning being achieved by conning the ship. Type 286PU and Type 286W were fixed antennas sets for coastal vessels and submarines respectively. Type 286PQ had a steerable combined Tx / Rx antenna from the Type 291 set.

=== Type 290 ===
Type	Aerial outfit	Peak power (kW)	Frequency (MHz)	Wavelength (mm)	In service
290		100	214	1,400	

Metric target indication set, replacement for Type 286.

=== Type 291 ===
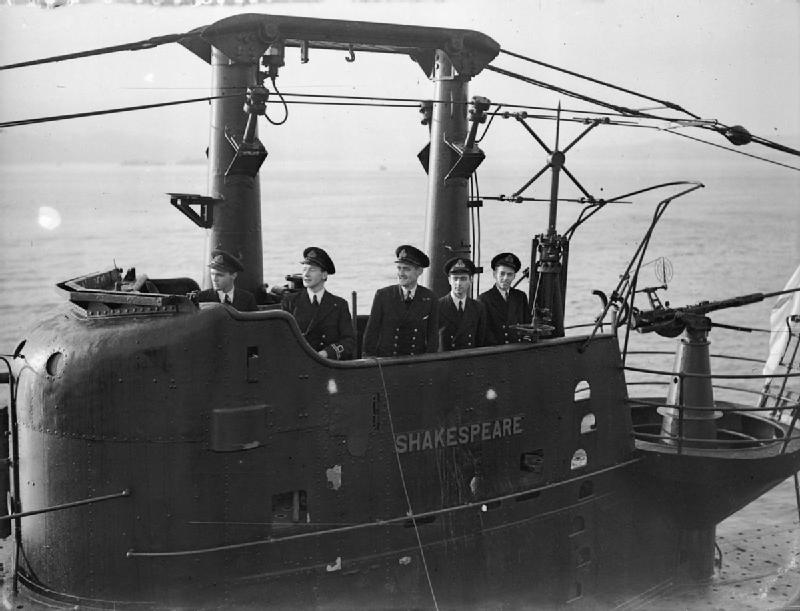
The conning tower of the submarine HMS Shakespeare is showing a 291W air-warning set

Type	Aerial outfit	Peak power (kW)	Frequency (MHz)	Wavelength (mm)	In service
291		100	214	1,400	1941

Metric air warning sets. Original Type 291 had a hand-steered antenna, replaced by Type 291M with power training and plan position indicator. U and W variants for coastal craft and submarines respectively.

=== Type 293 ===
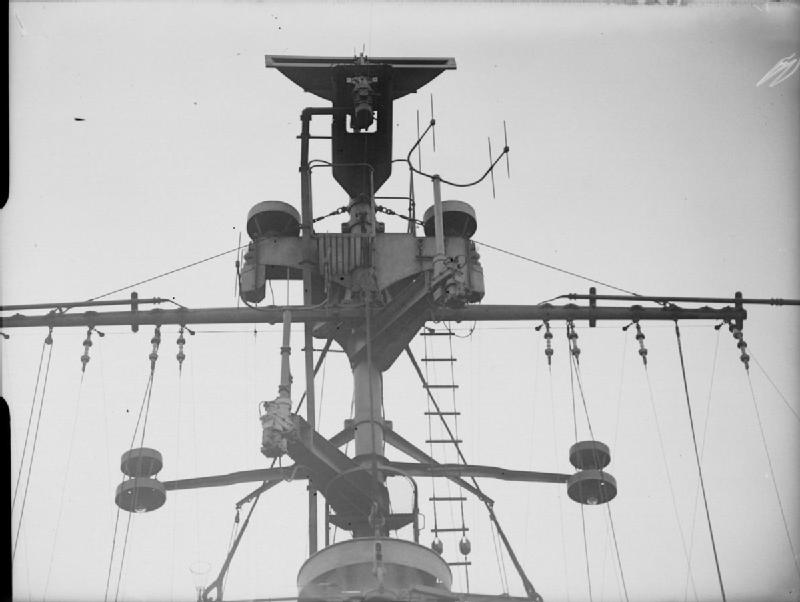
A Type 293 AVR antennae (upper centre) on HMS Swiftsure. The top of her 277 can just be seen at the bottom of the image.

Type	Aerial outfit	Peak power (kW)	Frequency (MHz)	Wavelength (mm)	In service
293M	AUR	500	2,997	100	1945
293P	AQR	500	2,997	100	1945
293Q	ANS	500	2,997	100	1945

Based on the same electronics as the Type 277/276, the Type 293 used a new antenna design intended to cover the area above the ship to provide air warning instead of surface search. Stabilised "cheese" antenna, 6 feet (1.8 m) diameter in outfit AUR, upgraded to 8 feet (2.4 m) in Type 293P (replaced all Type 293 and Type 276 sets) and to 12 feet (3.7 m) in Type 293Q.

=== Precision Ranging Panel ===
The Precision Ranging Panel (PRP) was an electromechanical transmission and calculating system. The PRP allowed for accurate range determination, range rate determination using radar, and accurate transmission of radar ranges and range rates to fire control computers. The PRP used an electronic timing signal and pip matching to provide very accurate ranges. It also used a power follow up to continuously transmit the correct range rate as long as the target maintained a steady course and speed. The PRP was adapted from the British Army's Radar, Gun Laying system, and first went to sea in 1939 aboard several C-class cruisers, using the Type 280 radar. By 1941 the PRP was a common feature on the Type 280, 279 and 281 radars, and by late 1941 began to appear on the type 282P, 284P and 285P radar systems.

=== Mechanical Ranging Panel ===
The Type 282, 282M, 285, and 285M radars used a mechanical ranging panel that used a mechanical cursor placed over the ranging display, to estimate range and automatically transmitted the calculated range to either the HACS or FKC fire control computer. Type 285 used Ranging Panel L12 and this also featured range rate estimation with power follow up so that the ranging panel would continue to transmit the correct range without operator intervention as long as the target maintained a steady course at a constant speed.

== See also ==
- List of World War II electronic warfare equipment
- History of radar
