= Slot antenna =

Type of antenna used for various communication

X-band slotted waveguide marine radar antenna on ship, 8–12 GHz. The antenna radiates a narrow vertical fan-shaped beam of microwaves, scanning the entire 360° water surface around the ship with each rotation.

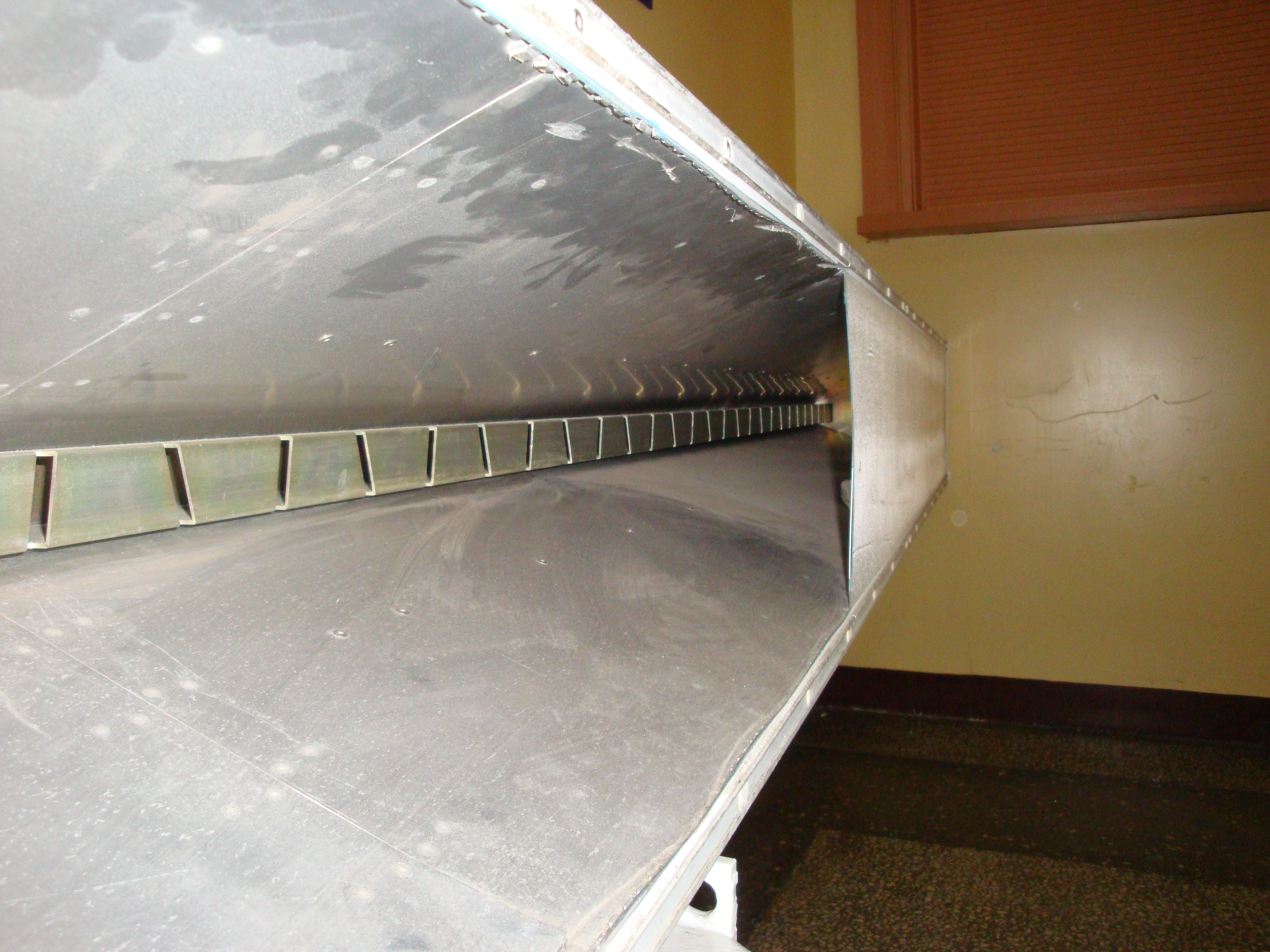
Cross section of similar marine radar antenna with part of plastic radome removed, showing slots in waveguide.

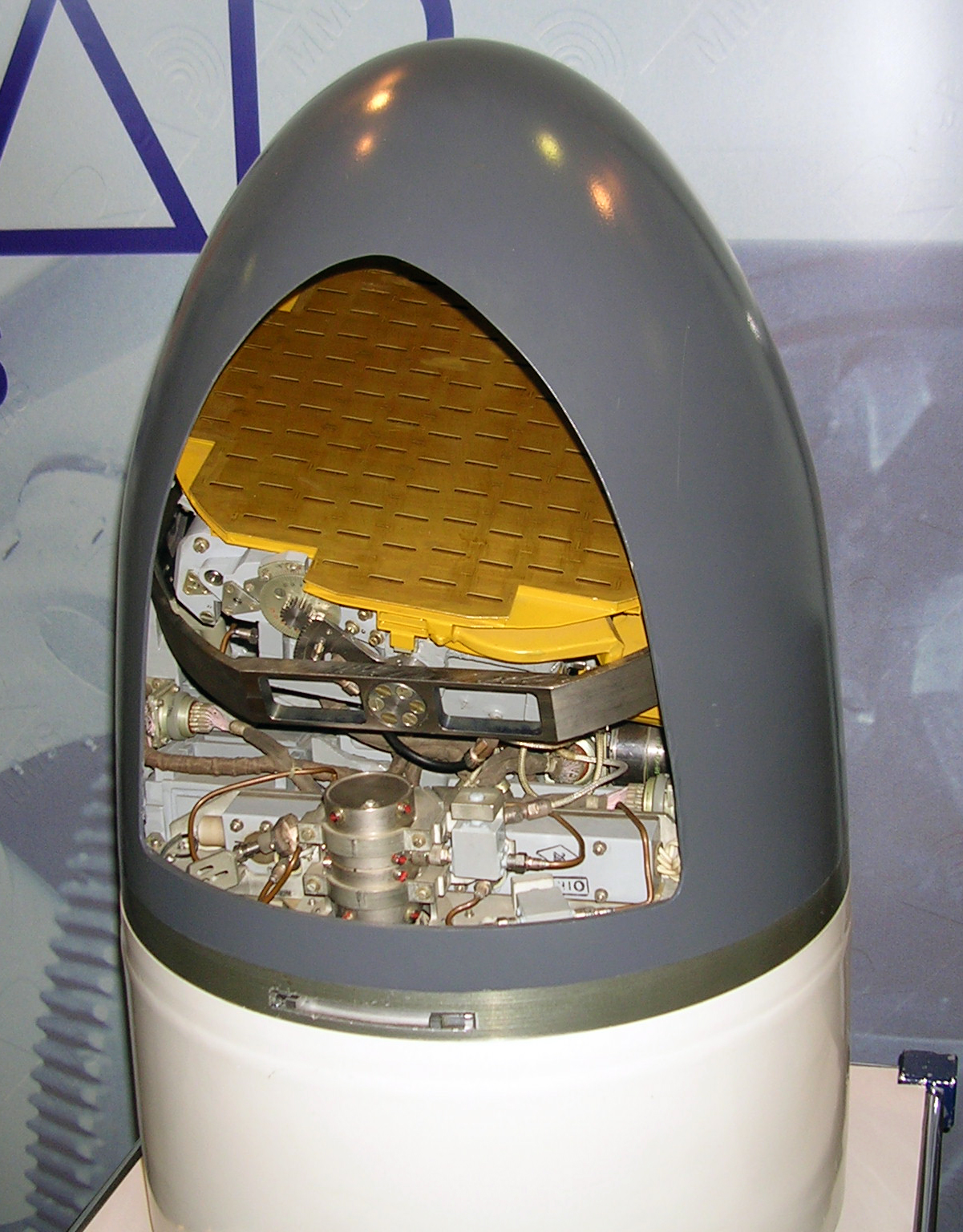
Seeker of the Kh-35E anti-ship missile with slotted antenna.

A slot antenna consists of a metal surface, usually a flat plate, with one or more holes or slots cut out. When the plate is driven as an antenna by an applied radio frequency current, the slot radiates electromagnetic waves in a way similar to a dipole antenna. The shape and size of the slot, as well as the driving frequency, determine the radiation pattern. Slot antennas are usually used at UHF and microwave frequencies at which wavelengths are small enough that the plate and slot are conveniently small. At these frequencies, the radio waves are often conducted by a waveguide, and the antenna consists of slots in the waveguide; this is called a slotted waveguide antenna. Multiple slots act as a directive array antenna and can emit a narrow fan-shaped beam of microwaves. They are used in standard laboratory microwave sources used for research, UHF television transmitting antennas, antennas on missiles and aircraft, sector antennas for cellular base stations, and particularly marine radar antennas. A slot antenna's main advantages are its size, design simplicity, and convenient adaptation to mass production using either waveguide or PC board technology.

== Structure ==
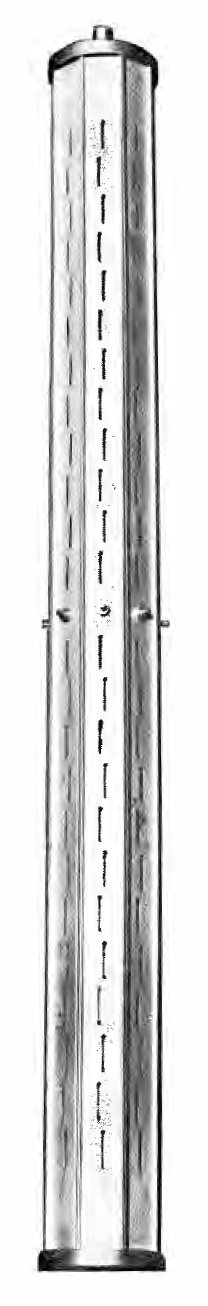
Slotted array UHF television broadcasting antenna

As shown by H. G. Booker in 1946, from Babinet's principle in optics a slot in a metal plate or waveguide has the same radiation pattern as a driven rod antenna whose rod is the same shape as the slot, with the exception that the electric field and magnetic field directions are interchanged; the antenna is a magnetic dipole instead of an electric dipole; the magnetic field is parallel to the long axis of the slot and the electric field is perpendicular. Thus the radiation pattern of a slot can be calculated by the same well-known equations used for rod element antennas like the dipole. The waves are linearly polarized perpendicular to the slot axis. Slots up to a wavelength long have a single main lobe with maximum radiation perpendicular to the surface.

Antennas consisting of multiple parallel slots in a waveguide are widely used array antennas. They have a radiation pattern similar to a corresponding linear array of dipole antennas, with the exception that the slot can only radiate into the space on one side of the waveguide surface, 180° of the surrounding space. There are two widely used types:

Longitudinal slotted waveguide antenna
The slots' axis is parallel to the axis of the waveguide. This has a radiation pattern similar to a collinear dipole antenna, and is usually mounted vertically. The radiation pattern is almost omnidirectional in the horizontal plane perpendicular to the antenna over the 180° azimuth in front of the slot, but narrow in the vertical plane, with the vertical gain increasing approximately 3 dB with each doubling of the number of slots. The radiation is horizontally polarized. It is used for vertical omnidirectional transmitting antennas for UHF television stations. For broadcasting, a cylindrical or semicircular waveguide is sometimes used with several columns of slots cut in different sides to give an omnidirectional 360° radiation pattern.
Transverse slotted waveguide antenna
The slots are almost perpendicular to the axis of the waveguide but skewed at a small angle, with alternate slots skewed at opposite angles. This radiates a dipole pattern in the plane perpendicular to the antenna, and a very sharp beam in the plane of the antenna. Its largest use is for microwave marine radar antennas. The antenna is mounted horizontally on a mechanical drive that rotates the antenna about a vertical axis, scanning the antenna's vertical fan-shaped beam 360° around the water surface surrounding the ship out to the horizon with each revolution. The wide vertical spread of the beam ensures that even in bad weather when the ship and the antenna axis is being rocked over a wide angle by waves the radar beam will not miss the surface.

A radial line slot antenna is a planar slotted-waveguide array in which slots are fed by a radial waveguide. It was invented by Naohisa Goto, professor emeritus at the Tokyo Institute of Technology, and has been used as a high-efficiency planar antenna for satellite broadcast reception; a lightweight honeycomb-structure version was reported for space use and was also used as a high-gain antenna on Hayabusa2.

== History ==
The slot antenna was invented in 1938 by Alan Blumlein, while working for EMI. He invented it in order to produce a practical type of antenna for VHF television broadcasting that would have horizontal polarization, an omnidirectional horizontal radiation pattern and a narrow vertical radiation pattern.

Prior to its use in surface search radar, such systems used a parabolic segment reflector, or "cheese antenna". The slotted waveguide antenna was the result of collaborative radar research carried on by McGill University and the National Research Council of Canada during World War II. The co-inventors, W.H. Watson and E.W. Guptill of McGill, were granted a United States patent for the device, described as a "directive antenna for microwaves", in 1951.

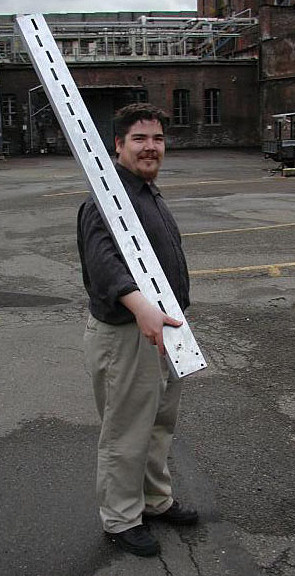
Slotted waveguide antenna for 2.4 GHz.

== Other uses ==
In a related application, so-called leaky waveguides are also used in the determination of railcar positions in certain rapid transit applications. They are used primarily to determine the precise position of the train when it is being brought to a halt at a station, so that the doorway positions will align correctly with queuing points on the platform or with a second set of safety doors should such be provided.

== See also ==
- Microwave Radiometer (Juno) (has a slot array antenna)
- RIMFAX (radar for Mars rover has slot antenna design)
