= Cheese antenna =

Type of microwave-frequency radio antenna

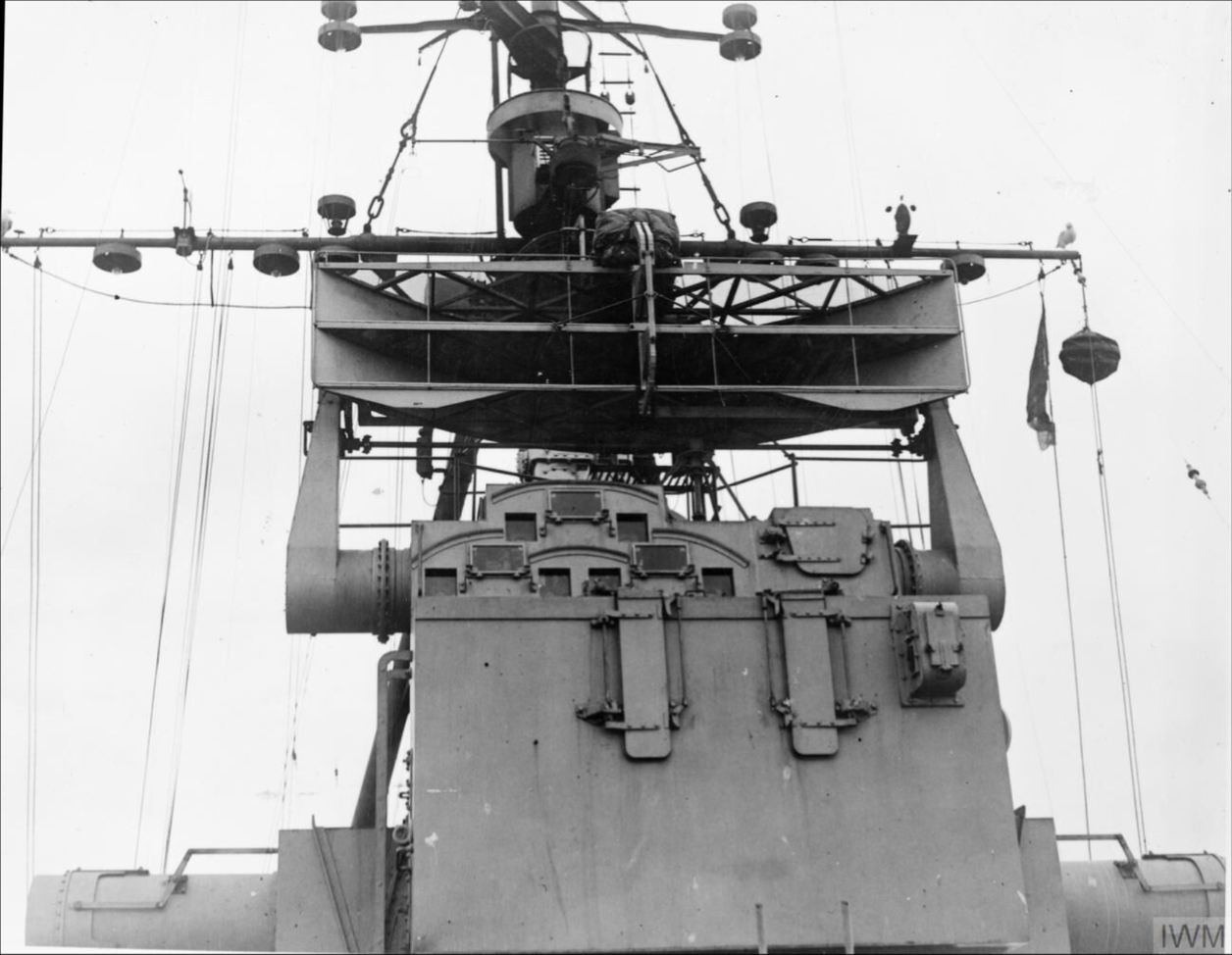
The Royal Navy Type 271 radar was the first application of the cheese design. This Type 274 used a "double cheese", with the upper surface made of wire mesh rather than a solid plate.

The cheese antenna, also known as a pillbox antenna, is a type of microwave-frequency parabolic antenna used in certain types of radar. The antenna consists of a cylindrical parabolic reflector consisting of sheet metal with a parabolic curve in one dimension and flat in the other, with metal plates covering the open sides, and a feed antenna, almost always some sort of feed horn, in front, pointing back toward the reflector. When the antenna is wide along its flat axis it is called a pillbox antenna and when narrow a cheese antenna. The name comes from the resulting antenna looking like a segment that has been cut from a wheel of cheese.

Cheese antennas produce a beam of microwaves that is narrow in the antenna's curved dimension, and wide in the flat dimension. The result is a broad fan-shaped radiation pattern sometimes called a beaver-tail pattern. These are used when the location in a single plane is desired, which is often the case for horizon-scanning radars seen on ships. The first example of the cheese was developed for the Royal Navy's Type 271 radar, allowing it to accurately measure the bearing to a target while having a wide vertical coverage so the reflection would remain in the beam while the ship pitched up and down in the waves.

Similar designs may also be found in height finding radars, with the antenna turned "sideways" in order to accurately measure the elevation angle. These are not widespread, as most height finders used a modified "orange peel" design to focus in azimuth as well, in order to be able to pick out a single aircraft.

While common into the 1960s, the use of slot antennas and phased array antennas has led to the cheese becoming less common.
