= Ernest Wilmot Guptill =

Canadian physicist

- Born: 5 September 1919; Grand Manan, New Brunswick, Canada
- Died: 20 March 1976 (aged 56); Halifax, Nova Scotia
- Occupations: Physicist, university professor

Ernest Wilmot Guptill (5 September 1919 – 20 March 1976) was a Canadian physicist. He spent his academic career at Dalhousie University, where he was department head for ten years. He was co-inventor of the slotted waveguide antenna.

== Early life and education ==
Guptill, the son of a fisherman, was born in the village of Grand Harbour on Grand Manan Island. He attended Acadia University in Wolfville, Nova Scotia as an undergraduate. After earning an Honours Bachelor of Science degree in physics from Acadia, he studied at the University of Western Ontario, where he earned a Master of Science degree, and then went to McGill University for his doctoral studies. He was awarded a PhD by McGill in 1946. His doctoral dissertation was entitled A Linear Accelerator for Electrons.

== The slotted waveguide antenna ==
Between 1942 and 1944 Guptill worked on radar research, in which McGill was collaborating with the Canadian National Research Council as part of the war effort. He was the co-inventor of the slotted waveguide antenna. The antennas were first used for the air defense of Great Britain. After the war the technology was adapted for use in ocean-going vessels, including small fishing boats. It was also used in NORAD's Pinetree Line, a series of radar stations built in Canada and the United States in the 1950s for the purpose of detecting Soviet bombers approaching North America. Guptill and co-inventor W.H. Watson were granted a United States patent for the device, described as a "directive antenna for microwaves", in 1951.

== Career at Dalhousie University ==
Guptill began teaching at Dalhousie University in 1947. After a sabbatical year at the University of Leiden he was named head of Dalhousie's physics department, a position he held for ten years before returning to teaching and research full-time. He was described as "that treasure, an excellent researcher and a gifted teacher". Among his research specialties were high frequency sound waves in liquid and low temperature physics.

== Death and legacy ==
Guptill, an experienced sailor, died in a boating accident on 20 March 1976. He and a friend were out in rowboat on the Northwest Arm in Halifax Harbour when the boat capsized. Guptill rescued his friend, a non-swimmer, and helped him to cling to the overturned boat, but by the time help arrived both men had died of hypothermia.

He is commemorated by the annual "E.W. Guptill Memorial Lecture" series in Dalhousie's Department of Physics and Atmospheric Science.
