= Type 281 radar =

British naval early-warning radar developed during World War II

Type 281
- Country of origin: United Kingdom
- Introduced: 1940
- No. built: 59
- Type: Early-warning radar
- Frequency: 86–94 MHz
- PRF: 50 per second
- Beamwidth: 35° (horizontal)
- Pulsewidth: 2–3 μs or 15 μs
- Range: 115 nmi (213 km; 132 mi)
- Altitude: 30,000 feet (9,100 m)
- Power: 350 kW–1 MW

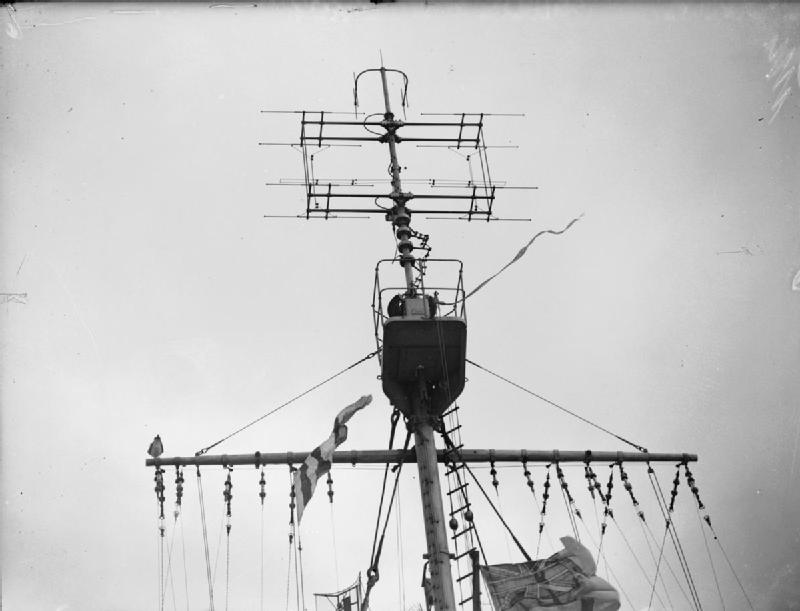
281 B Aerial on board HMS Swiftsure at Scapa Flow.

The Type 281 radar was a British naval early-warning radar developed during World War II. It replaced the Type 79 as the Royal Navy's main early-warning radar during the war.

The prototype system was mounted on the light cruiser HMS Dido in October 1940. This radar used a frequency of 90 MHz, a beamwidth of 35°, and a wavelength of 3.5 m (3.8 yd). It required separate transmitting and receiving antennas that were rotated by hand. For long-range warning the radar used a 15 microsecond pulse at a power level of 350 kW that gave a detection range up to 110 nautical miles (200 km; 130 mi) for aircraft. For tracking surface targets it used a 2–3 microsecond pulse at 1 MW that gave a range up to 12 nautical miles (22 km; 14 mi). A second set was installed in January 1941 aboard the battleship HMS Prince of Wales and production began of another 57 sets, with the first ones delivered the following month. This set also had a secondary aerial and surface gunnery capability, and used a Precision Ranging Panel. The Type 281 ranging system allowed the user to select either a 2,000 yards (1,830 m) to 14,000 yards (12,800 m) or a 2,000 yards (1,830 m) to 25,000 yards (22,860 m) range display with range accuracies of 50 yards (50 m) or 75 yards (70 m) RMS, respectively. Aerial target ranges were passed directly to the HACS table (fire control computer).

Type 281B consolidated the transmission and receiving antennas, and the Type 281BP radar had the short-pulse feature removed. It was fitted with improved receivers that increased the maximum detection range for an aircraft at 20,000 feet (6,100 m) to 120 nautical miles (220 km; 140 mi). At lower altitudes, ranges declined to 90 nautical miles (170 km; 100 mi) at 10,000 feet (3,050 m) and 65 nautical miles (120 km; 75 mi) at 5,000 feet (1,520 m). The Type 281BQ was a Type 281BP fitted with power rotation, at 2 or 4 rpm, and equipped with a plan position indicator. After the end of the war the Type 281 was replaced by the Type 960 radar.

== Bibliography ==
- Brown, Louis (1999). A Radar History of World War II: Technological and Military Imperatives. Bristol and Philadelphia: Institute of Physics Publishing. ISBN 0-7503-0659-9.
- Friedman, Norman (1981). Naval Radar. London: Conway Maritime Press. ISBN 0-85177-238-2.
- Pout, H.W. (1995). "Weapon Direction in the Royal Navy". In Kingsley, F.A. (ed.). The Application of Radar and other Electronic Systems in the Royal Navy in World War 2. London: Macmillan. ISBN 0-333-62748-2.
- Mitchell, Alastair (1980). "The Development of Radar in the Royal Navy (1935–45), Part I". In Roberts, John (ed.). Warship IV. London: Conway Maritime Press. ISBN 0-85177-205-6.
- Swords, Sean S. (1986). Technical History of the Beginnings of Radar. London: IEE/Peter Peregrinus. ISBN 0-86341-043-X.
- Watson, Raymond C. Jr. (2009). Radar Origins Worldwide: History of Its Evolution in 13 Nations Through World War II. Trafford. ISBN 978-1-4269-2111-7.
