= HMS Saltburn =

Minesweeper of the Royal Navy

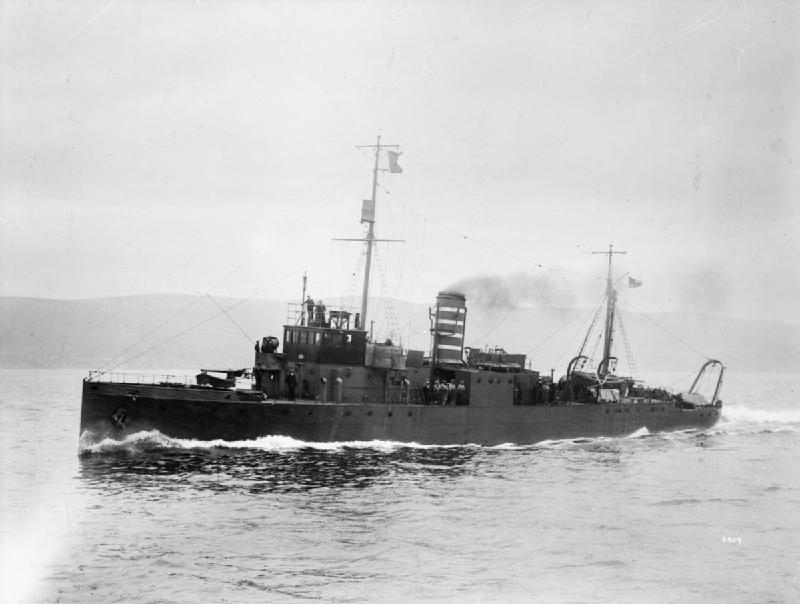
- Sister ship HMS Belvoir circa. 1917–1918

History

United Kingdom
- Name: HMS Saltburn
- Namesake: Saltburn-by-the-Sea
- Builder: Murdoch and Murray
- Laid down: 29 January 1918
- Launched: 9 October 1918
- Completed: 31 December 1918
- Fate: Sold for scrap, 16 November 1946
- Notes: Pennant number N52

General characteristics (1939)
- Class & type: Hunt-class minesweeper
- Displacement: 710 long tons (721 t)
- Length: 231 ft (70.4 m)
- Beam: 28 ft 6 in (8.7 m)
- Draught: 8 ft (2.4 m)
- Installed power: 2,200 ihp (1,600 kW)
- Propulsion: 2 shafts; 2 Vertical triple-expansion steam engines; Yarrow water-tube boilers
- Speed: 16 knots (30 km/h; 18 mph)
- Range: 1,500 nmi (2,800 km; 1,700 mi) at 10 knots (19 km/h; 12 mph)
- Complement: 74
- Armament: 1 × QF 4-inch (102 mm) gun forward; 1 × QF 12-pounder aft; 2 × .303 inch machine guns

HMS Saltburn was a Hunt-class minesweeper built for the Royal Navy during World War I. Named after the town of Saltburn-by-the-Sea in North Yorkshire, she was not completed until after the end of the war. The ship saw no active service during World War II as she spent the war as a training ship. Saltburn was sold for scrap in 1946, but was wrecked while under tow.

Saltburn was built by Murdoch and Murray of Port Glasgow and her keel was laid down on 29 January 1918. She was launched on 9 October 1918 and completed on 31 December 1918. The ship was armed with a QF 4-inch (102 mm) gun forward and a QF 12-pounder anti-aircraft gun aft.

In the 1930s, Saltburn was the RN Signal School's tender. A prototype Type 79X radar was installed in October 1936 and its antennas were strung between the ship's masts. They detected an aircraft at an altitude of 500 feet (150 m) and a range of 17 nautical miles (31 km; 20 mi) during tests in July 1937. The ship spent World War II as the tender for HMS Dryad, the Royal Navy's navigation school.

After the war, Saltburn ran aground off Horse Sand Fort on 26 October 1945 and was declared a constructive total loss. She was sold for scrap on 16 November 1946, but was wrecked around 2 miles south of Hartland Point, Devon, the following month while under tow. The wrecking rights were bought by a local man, Jack Gifford. The stairs of the ship still exist in a cottage in Hartland. The cottage is named Saltburn after the ship.
