= HMS Orchis =

Flower-class corvette

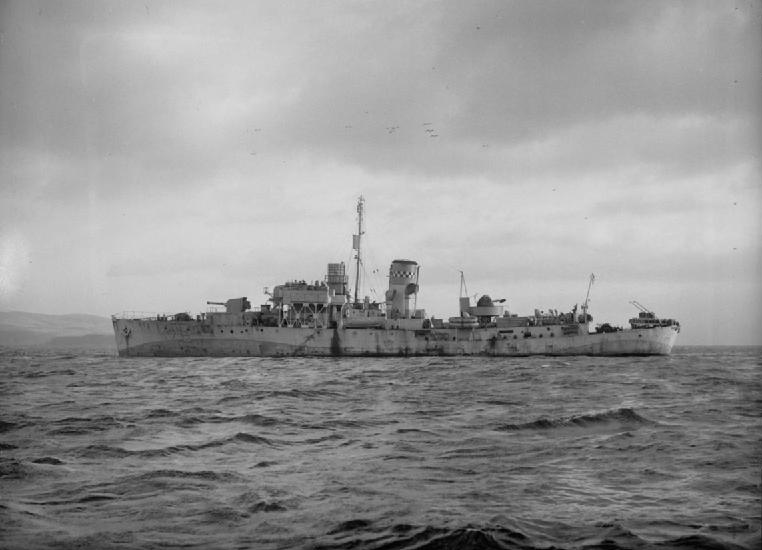
- Underway in the River Clyde, December 1942

History

United Kingdom
- Name: HMS Orchis
- Builder: Harland & Wolff
- Yard number: 1075
- Laid down: 18 June 1940
- Launched: 15 October 1940
- Completed: 29 November 1940
- Commissioned: 29 November 1940
- Identification: Pennant number: K76
- Fate: Mined off Juno Beach 21 August 1944

General characteristics
- Class & type: Flower-class corvette
- Displacement: 925 long tons
- Length: 205 ft (62 m) o/a
- Beam: 33 ft (10 m)
- Draught: 11 ft 6 in (3.51 m)
- Propulsion: 1 × 4-cycle triple-expansion reciprocating steam engine; 2 × fire tube Scotch boilers; Single shaft; 2,750 ihp (2,050 kW)
- Speed: 16 kn (30 km/h)
- Range: 3,500 nmi (6,500 km) at 12 kn (22 km/h)
- Complement: 90
- Sensors & processing systems: 1 × Type 271 radar from March 1941; 1 × Type 123A or Type 127DV sonar
- Armament: 1 × BL 4-inch (101.6 mm) Mk.IX gun; 2 × Vickers .50 cal machine gun (twin); 2 × Lewis .303 cal machine gun (twin); 2 × Mk.II Depth charge throwers; 2 × Depth charge rails with 40 depth charges

Service record
- Operations: Battle of the Atlantic

HMS Orchis was a Flower-class corvette that served in the Royal Navy during World War II.

== North Atlantic trade convoy escort ==
In March 1941, Orchis was the first ship fitted with the very successful 10-cm wavelength Type 271 radar enabling detection of a surfaced submarine at 5,000 yards (4,600 m) or a submarine periscope at 1,300 yards (1,200 m). Orchis was assigned first to the 4th Escort Group based at Greenock and then to Escort Group B3 of the Mid-Ocean Escort Force through early 1944. Orchis escorted convoy ONS 18 during the battle around this and ON 202.

== English Channel ==
Orchis was then assigned to patrol the English Channel, and sank the German submarine U-741 on 15 August 1944. U-741 torpedoed LST-404 of convoy FTM-69 while Orchis was escorting nearby convoy FTC-68. Orchis gained and held sonar contact on U-741 and flooded the forward part of the U-boat with two Hedgehog attacks and two depth charge attacks. One person escaped from the aft torpedo-room hatch of the sunken U-boat, and was rescued by Orchis.

On 21 August 1944, Orchis struck a mine that destroyed the bow back to the 4-inch gun. The damaged ship was beached on Juno Beach and declared a total loss.
