= Type 79 radar =

Type 79
- Country of origin: United Kingdom
- Introduced: 1938
- No. built: 40
- Type: Early-warning radar
- Frequency: 43 MHz
- PRF: 50 per second
- Beamwidth: 70° (horizontal)
- Pulsewidth: 8-30 μs
- Range: 30–50 mi (48–80 km)?
- Power: 70 kW

The Type 79 radar was a British naval early-warning radar developed before World War II. It was the first radar system deployed by the Royal Navy.

The first version of this radar, Type 79X, was mounted on the RN Signal School's tender, the minesweeper HMS Saltburn, in October 1936. This equipment used a frequency of 75 MHz and a wavelength of 4 metres and its antennae were strung between the ship's masts. They detected an aircraft at an altitude of 500 feet (150 m) and a range of 17 nautical miles (31 km; 20 mi) during tests in July 1937.

Improved versions, Type 79Y, were developed the following year that used a frequency of 43 MHz (7 metres). It required separate transmitting and receiving antennas and had a power output between 15 and 20 kW. The first set was installed in September 1938 aboard the light cruiser HMS Sheffield and gave detection ranges up to 53 nautical miles (98 km; 61 mi) for an aircraft at 10,000 feet (3,050 m). A second set was mounted on the battleship HMS Rodney the following month, but it was not tested until January 1939.

A more powerful version, Type 79Z, was fitted to the anti-aircraft cruiser HMS Curlew in September 1939 and proved to be successful enough that forty more sets were ordered with the designation of Type 79. The antennae were manually rotated, but only enough wire was provided to rotate a maximum of 400°.

Type 79B consolidated the transmitting and receiving antennae into one and its detection range was increased to 90 nautical miles (170 km; 100 mi) for an aircraft at 20,000 feet (6,100 m). The radar also had a secondary ability to track a surface target at ranges from 2–6 nautical miles (3.7–11.1 km; 2.3–6.9 mi).

== Bibliography ==
- Brown, Louis (1999). A Radar History of World War II: Technological and Military Imperatives. Bristol and Philadelphia: Institute of Physics Publishing. ISBN 0-7503-0659-9.
- Friedman, Norman (1981). Naval Radar. London: Conway Maritime Press. ISBN 0-85177-238-2.
- Swords, Sean S. (1986). Technical History of the Beginnings of Radar. London: IEE/Peter Peregrinus. ISBN 0-86341-043-X.
- Watson, Raymond C. Jr. (2009). Radar Origins Worldwide: History of Its Evolution in 13 Nations Through World War II. Trafford. ISBN 978-1-4269-2111-7.
