= 1946 New Year Honours (MBE) =

This is a list of MBEs awarded in the 1946 New Year Honours

The 1946 New Year Honours were appointments by many of the Commonwealth Realms of King George VI to various orders and honours to reward and highlight good works by citizens of those countries, and to celebrate the passing of 1945 and the beginning of 1946. They were announced on 1 January 1946 for the United Kingdom, and Dominions, Canada, the Union of South Africa, and New Zealand.

== Member of the Order of the British Empire (MBE) ==
=== Military Division ===
==== Royal Navy ====
- Telegraphist Lieutenant Thomas Congdon Adams, (Retd).
- Temporary Lieutenant (A) David Paul Adamson, RNVR.
- Lieutenant-Commander (S) David Christopher Aherne, (Retd).
- Temporary Captain William Taylor Allen, RME.
- Temporary Lieutenant (Acting Temporary Captain) Arthur John Austin, Royal Marines.
- Mr. Clifford Avent, Temporary Acting Commissioned Master-at-Arms.
- Acting Captain (Commissioned Staff Sergeant Major (Retd.)) Julius Bach, Royal Marines.
- Lieutenant (A) George Philip Barlass.
- Mr. Alfred George Bearne, Temporary Warrant Shipwright.
- Temporary Captain (Acting Temporary Major) James Ivor Berry, Royal Marines.
- Mr. James Dole Bond, Acting Commissioned Engineer.
- Mr. Stanley John Broad, Temporary Warrant Stores Officer.
- Julia Margaret Brunton, First Officer, WRNS.
- Mr. Jeffrey Thomas Buckland, Warrant Telegraphist, RANVR.
- Acting Lieutenant-Commander (E) William Edgar Budge, (Retd).
- Temporary Acting Lieutenant-Commander (S) Donald Arthur Bussell, RNVR.
- Temporary Surgeon Lieutenant (D) Norman Fison Clarke, RNVR.
- Temporary Acting Lieutenant-Commander (Sp.) Harold Montague Clements, RNVR.
- The Reverend Herbert William Coffey, Chaplain, RNVR.
- Ellen Isabel Collier, First Officer, WRNS.
- Lieutenant Bruce Collins.
- Temporary Lieutenant William Dymond Croke, Royal Marines.
- Temporary Sub-Lieutenant Ronald Cyril Curtis, RNR.
- Temporary Surgeon Lieutenant Joseph Irwin Cunningham, MB, BCh, RNVR.
- Wardmaster Lieutenant Robert Edward Dickie, (Retd).
- Acting Surgeon Lieutenant-Commander Paul Frank D'Mellow, RINVR.
- Mr. William Arthur Drew, Warrant Cookery Officer (O).
- Mr. Lewis Hedley Earley, Acting Commissioned Engineer.
- Kathleen Mary Alice Earnshaw, First Officer, WRNS.
- Lieutenant-Commander (S) Walter Herbert Ely.
- Acting Lieutenant-Commander (E) Phillip Geoffrey Everall, RNVR.
- Lieutenant (E) Arthur William Fairhead.
- Temporary Acting Lieutenant (Sp.) John Dalton Forbes-Watson, RNVR.
- Lieutenant-Commander (S) William Henry Franks, (Retd).
- Honorary Lieutenant (S) Robert Stafford Furlong, RNVR.
- The Reverend Percival Gay, VD, Chaplain, RNVR.
- Grace Allan Gibson, Second Officer, WRNS.
- Lieutenant (E) Herbert Good, DSC.
- Mr. George Mark Grayston, Superintending Clerk, Royal Marines.
- Temporary Lieutenant (Sp.) Samuel John Griggs, RNVR.
- Temporary Acting Lieutenant-Commander (E) William Stanley Groom, RNR.
- Surgeon Lieutenant (D) Robert Garth Gwynn, RNVR.
- Temporary Lieutenant (Sp.) Hugh Lavaine Gwyther, RNVR.
- Ann Rosada Haldin, Second Officer, WRNS.
- Mr. George Thomas James Harrison, Sub-Divisional Inspector, RMP.
- Acting Shipwright Lieutenant-Commander Marchant James Hawkins.
- Mr. William Stanley Anthony Hawley, Temporary Warrant Electrician.
- Lieutenant-Commander (E) Charles Hembry Hayward, RNVR.
- Temporary Lieutenant George Wilfred Henderson, RNR.
- Temporary Acting Lieutenant-Commander Kenneth Norman Herbert, RNVR.
- Honorary Lieutenant Benjamin Ewart Herman, RINVR.
- Mr. William John Holt, Temporary Signal Boatswain.
- Lieutenant-Commander (S) Alick Vavasour Hooley, RNR.
- Temporary Lieutenant Vernon Sadler Horsnell, RNVR.
- Mr. Frederick William Howe, Warrant Recruiter.
- Muriel Sivewright Howie, Second Officer, WRNS.
- Lieutenant Walter Edwin Herbert Hubble.
- Captain William Harry Hughes, Royal Marines.
- Acting Lieutenant-Commander (Sp.) Frank Douglas Judd, RINVR.
- Mr. Edward Alfred George Kearvell, Temporary Warrant Wardmaster.
- Temporary Sub-Lieutenant (A) Hugh McLennan Kendall, RNVR.
- Captain Herbert Kenward, Royal Marines.
- Temporary Lieutenant (Sp.) Frank Robert King, RNVR.
- Mr. Walter Kirkwood, Temporary Acting Commissioned Telegraphist.
- Temporary Captain (Acting Temporary Major) Maurice Patrick Charles Krarup, Royal Marines.
- Mr. Alexander William Lane, Commissioned Engineer.
- Temporary Sub-Lieutenant Cecil John Lang, RNVR.
- Lieutenant (A) Peter Godfrey Lawrence.
- Temporary-Lieutenant (S) Arthur Percy Lee, RNVR.
- Acting Lieutenant-Commander (E) Bhalchandra Nagesh Lele, Royal Indian Navy.
- Temporary Lieutenant (Sp.) John Addison Lewis, RNVR.
- Mary Olwen Liddell, Second Officer, WRNS.
- Lieutenant (E) Richard William George Lobb, (Retd).
- Mr. Samuel William Loynes, Temporary Warrant Officer, Royal Indian Navy.
- Lieutenant Henry Edward Lukey, (Retd).
- Temporary Acting Lieutenant-Commander (S) Kenneth Archibald McLellan, RNVR.
- Temporary Lieutenant (E) William Mackenzie, RNVR.
- Lieutenant (A) Donald Gordon MacQueen, RNVR.
- Temporary Acting Lieutenant (Sp.) Crawford Murray Maclehose, RNVR.
- Mr. James McDonald Malekin, Temporary Warrant Writer Officer.
- Temporary Lieutenant Eric Charles Ramshaw Marston, RNVR.
- Temporary Acting Lieutenant-Commander William Alistair Morrison, RNR.
- Mr. Algernon Morton, Senior Chief Officer, Shore Wireless Service.
- Patricia Maude Murray, First Officer, WRNS.
- Margaret Naish, Second Officer, WRNS.
- Temporary Lieutenant Thomas Leslie Newbigin, RNVR.
- Annie Duncan Niven, Second Officer, WRNS.
- Hilary Lucy Overy, Chief Officer, WRNS.
- Temporary Lieutenant (Sp.) Frank Arthur Parker, RNVR.
- Lieutenant (S) John Hugo Heddle Paterson, RANR.
- Wardmaster Lieutenant Sidney Laurence Peck.
- Frances Jill Porteous, Second Officer, WRNS.
- Captain (Acting Major) David Oldrid Powell, Royal Marines.
- Temporary Acting Lieutenant-Commander (S) Andrew Frederick Arthur Powles, RNVR.
- Honorary Lieutenant-Commander Herbert James Burnell Brayley Quicke, RINVR.
- Mr. Richard Alfred Rand, DSM, Warrant Engineer.
- Temporary Lieutenant (E) Richard Redwood, RNVR.
- Headmaster Lieutenant John Leonard Rees.
- Temporary Lieutenant (A) Edward Gregory Richardson, RNVR.
- Temporary Lieutenant Robert Gresham Roberts, RNVR.
- Temporary Lieutenant (Sp.) David de Mouilpied Robin, RNVR.
- Lieutenant-Commander (E) William James Robins, (Retd).
- Acting Lieutenant-Commander (Sp.) Eric William Roper, RINVR.
- Lieutenant-Commander (S) Ronald John Ruby, (Retd).
- Mr. William Arthur Ruffell, Warrant Shipwright.
- Temporary Lieutenant (Sp.) Harold Reginald Salisbury, RNVR.
- Temporary Sub-Lieutenant (A) Edward Henry Short, RNVR.
- Anne Lucy Simonds, Third Officer, WRNS.
- Temporary Lieutenant Harold Smedley, Royal Marines.
- Mr. Reginald Edward Streat, Temporary Warrant Mechanician.
- Acting Headmaster Lieutenant Albert Edward Talbot.
- Joan Katherine Taylor, First Officer, WRNS.
- Mr. Joseph John Connelly Thompson, Temporary Acting Gunner.
- Mr. Geoffrey Edward Thrower, Acting Commissioned Staff Sergeant Major, Royal Marines.
- Temporary Lieutenant (S) Frederick Ronald Ware, RNVR.
- Mr. John David Watkins, Warrant Recruiter, Royal Marines.
- Mr. Frank Arthur Weeks, Acting Temporary Commissioned Staff Sergeant Major, Royal Marines.
- Temporary Captain James Maurice Whitaker, RME.
- Mr. Kenneth Alfred Pascall White, Warrant Shipwright.
- Shipwright Lieutenant Thomas Edmund White, (Retd).
- Temporary Lieutenant (Sp.) John Lee Whitehead, RNVR.
- Captain Charles Abner Wickins, Royal Marines.
- Lieutenant (S) Joseph Reginald Frederick Williamson, RNVR.
- Mr. Ernest Henry Willson, Temporary Boatswain.
- Temporary Acting Sub-Lieutenant (Sp.) Ian Dennis Wilson, RNVR.
- Cecilia Mary Rose Wood, First Officer, WRNS.
- Lieutenant Derek Cousin Wood.
- Acting Headmaster Lieutenant-Commander Cecil Ernest Wright.
- Temporary Lieutenant (S) Walter Reginald Douglas Yeadell, RNVR.

==== Army ====
- Bimbashi Abdel Razzak Effendi Ali Taha, Sudan Defence Force.
- No. 180918 Warrant Officer Class II Stanley Cyril Adams, Army Catering Corps.
- Major William Jamieson Adie (95375), The Gordon Highlanders.
- Junior Commander (temporary) Alice Aiton (192406), Auxiliary Territorial Service.
- Captain (temporary) George Hubert Allanson, MC, (42841), Special List (late Indian Army).
- Subaltern Ellen Mary Allen (260804), Auxiliary Territorial Service.
- Senior Commander (temporary) Begum Bilguis Amir (W.A.C.219), Women's Auxiliary Corps (India).
- Major John Anderson (S.T.178), Royal Indian Army Service Corps.
- Major (temporary) John Ernest Anderson (85076), Honourable Artillery Company.
- Major (temporary) William Anderson, DCM, (60669), Royal Regiment of Artillery.
- Lieutenant Annath Sankaran Nair (V.L.158), Indian Army Veterinary Corps.
- Warrant Officer Class II (Sergeant-Major) Samu Aporosa, Fiji Military Forces.
- Major (temporary) Alexander Glynn Arkle (134096), Royal Regiment of Artillery.
- Major (temporary) Alan Dudley Ashley (68280), Royal Regiment of Artillery.
- Captain (Quartermaster) Arthur Ashton (98837), Irish Guards.
- No. 7604856 Warrant Officer, Class II Fred Atherton, Corps of Royal.Engineers.
- No. 6977414 Warrant Officer Class I James Atkinson, Pioneer Corps.
- Junior Commander (acting) Julia Margaret Bagshawe (328440), Auxiliary Territorial Service.
- Major (temporary) John William Baker (124397), Royal Corps of Signals.
- Captain Douglas Joseph Baker (E.C.13474), "Special List" of Quartermasters of the Indian Army.
- No. 7685627 Warrant Officer Class II William Albert Hobson Baldry, Intelligence Corps.
- Major (temporary) Robert Edward Ball (124116), The Queen's Royal Regiment (West Surrey).
- No. 1882583 Warrant Officer Class II William Kenneth Ball, Corps of Royal Engineers.
- Major (temporary) Frank Banfield (167706), Royal Army Ordnance Corps.
- Major (temporary) John Meiklejohn Bannerman, ED, (A.F.903), Cawnpore Rifles, Auxiliary Force (India).
- Captain (temporary) James William Donald Barfoot (201961), Army Dental Corps.
- Captain (Quartermaster) Harry Barnes (147625), The Border Regiment.
- Lieutenant John Douglas Barrance (302526), Royal Corps of Signals.
- Major (temporary) Walter Barrett, ARIBA, (163557), Corps of Royal Engineers.
- No. 1913902 Warrant Officer Class II Leslie Bartlett, Corps of Royal Engineers.
- Major (temporary) John Maymon Barton (214215), Royal Regiment of Artillery.
- Captain (temporary) Khan Mohammed Bashir, Scinde Horse, Indian Armoured Corps.
- Captain Abdul Aziz Bashiry (M.Z.14471), Indian Army Medical Corps.
- No. 1986065 Warrant Officer Class II Wilfred Bates, Corps of Royal Engineers.
- No. 6189314 Warrant Officer Class II Bertie Batt, Royal Electrical and Mechanical Engineers.
- Major Oscar Frank Battye (123324), Royal Regiment of Artillery.
- Major (temporary) Arthur Edward Bay (E.G.2434), 16th Punjab Regiment, Indian Army.
- Major (temporary) Vivian Sheppard Bazalgette (12170), The King's Own Royal Regiment (Lancaster).
- Major (temporary) Donald Wales Beard (118503), Royal Army Service Corps.
- Captain (Quartermaster) Reginald John Beard (137619), Royal Regiment of Artillery.
- Major (acting) Geoffrey Reid Arnott Beckett, MC, (23368), Army Cadet Force.
- Lieutenant-Colonel (temporary) Anthony James Allan Beck (E.C.611), Indian Electrical and Mechanical Engineers.
- Lieutenant (local Major) Reginald Lewis Joshua Bedford (110720), General List.
- Captain Charles Beeston (287539), The King's Own Yorkshire Light Infantry.
- Major (temporary) Richard John Beisly (195262), Intelligence Corps.
- Major (temporary) Charles William Sandys Belas (53536), The East Yorkshire Regiment (The Duke of York's Own).
- No. 1418699 Warrant Officer Class II Leon Belither, Corps of Royal Engineers.
- No. S/215973 Warrant Officer Class I Albert George Bell, Royal Army Service Corps.
- Major (temporary) Francis Charles Bellamy (133690), Royal Army Ordnance Corps.
- Captain (temporary) Wilfrid Hamilton Bennett (99780), The Royal Fusiliers (City of London Regiment).
- Captain (Father) John Louis Benoit, Officer-in-Charge of the African Pioneer Corps Welfare Office at Maseru, Basutoland.
- No. 2649731 Warrant Officer Class I Alfred Cyril Benstead, The Royal Warwickshire Regiment.
- Major (temporary) Frederick Bentley (178659), Corps of Royal Engineers.
- Lieutenant-Colonel (temporary) Percy Holman Bentley, MC, AMIMechE, (114143), Royal Electrical and Mechanical Engineers.
- Major Reginald George Payne Besley, TD, (33916), The Somerset Light Infantry (Prince Albert's).
- Captain Bhagwan Singh (P.1305), Indian Engineers (Army Postal Services).
- Major (temporary) Prem Gopal Bhandari, (I.E.C.234), Indian Engineers.
- Major William Albert Bint (16640), The Royal Ulster Rifles.
- Major (temporary) Herbert Birchenhough, AMIMechE, AMIEE, (77090), Royal Electrical and Mechanical Engineers.
- Major (temporary) Kenneth Charles Bishop (63746), The Border Regiment.
- No. 764570 Warrant Officer Class I Reginald Blake, Royal Regiment of Artillery.
- Lieutenant-Colonel (temporary) Reginald Wallace Body (O.S.52), Indian Army Ordnance Corps.
- Captain (temporary) John Frederick Bore (204943), Royal Corps of Signals.
- Major (temporary) Albert William Bowes (287466), General List.
- Major Kenneth Richard Bowes, TD, (28329), The Leicestershire Regiment.
- Captain (temporary) Frank Bowman (168102), Royal Army Ordnance Corps.
- No. 13015920 Warrant Officer Class II William Bowtell, Pioneer Corps.
- Captain Arthur Bradley (159232), The Seaforth Highlanders (Ross-shire Buffs, The Duke of Albany's).
- No. 5344554 Warrant Officer Class II Albert James Trevor Brassett, Corps of Military Police.
- Captain (Quartermaster) Patrick Joseph Breen (154214), Royal Army Medical Corps.
- Lieutenant-Colonel (temporary) Cyprian John Bridge (78671), Royal Regiment of Artillery.
- Major (temporary) James Morgan Brierley (102082), Royal Regiment of Artillery.
- No. S/1883638 Warrant Officer Class I Kenneth Henry Broadley, Royal Army Service Corps.
- Captain John Percy Brodie, Fiji Military Forces.
- Captain (temporary) William Edward Brooks (219459), Royal Regiment of Artillery.
- Captain (acting) Frank Henry Brown, MC, (280408), Army Cadet Force.
- Major (temporary) George Brown (E.C.3174), Indian Army.
- Major (temporary) John Hercules Brown (122801), Corps of Royal Engineers.
- The Reverend Wilfrid Roland Alexis Brown, MC, TD, (39698), Chaplain to the Forces, Second Class (temporary), Royal Army Chaplains' Department.
- Lieutenant-Colonel (temporary) David Bryson (E.C.145), 14th Punjab Regiment, Indian Army.
- Captain (temporary) Kenneth Robert Leighton Buckwell (134122), The Buffs (Royal East Kent Regiment).
- No. 7655263 Warrant Officer Class I Godfrey Lionel Budden, Royal Army Ordnance Corps.
- No. 7809985 Warrant Officer Class I Frederick Jesse Bull, Pioneer Corps.
- Major (temporary) James William Bullen (O.S.225), Indian Army Ordnance Corps.
- No. 5511788 Warrant Officer Class II Eric Cecil Burdett, Army Educational Corps.
- Captain (Quartermaster) Sydney Charles Burford (199272), Royal Tank Regiment, Royal Armoured Corps.
- Captain (Quartermaster) Archibald Burnett (64654), The King's Regiment (Liverpool).
- Major (temporary) Charles Henderson Burnett (210620), Royal Army Service Corps.
- Major (temporary) Ian McKinlay Burns, MB, (150063), Royal Army Medical Corps.
- Captain (temporary) William Harrison Ponsonby Burnyeat (52555), Royal Regiment of Artillery.
- No. 2213220 Warrant Officer Class I Percy John Gordon Burroughs, Corps of Royal Engineers.
- No. 955462 Warrant Officer Class II John Burrows, Royal Regiment of Artillery.
- No. S/93575 Warrant Officer Class II William Henry Burton, Royal Army Service Corps.
- No. 548235 Warrant Officer Class II Robert Henry Butler, 7th Queen's Own Hussars, Royal Armoured Corps.
- Major (temporary) John William Caithness (138570), The Seaforth Highlanders (Ross-shire Buffs, The Duke of Albany's).
- Captain (temporary) Atholl Lester Campbell (303956), Royal Electrical and Mechanical Engineers.
- Major (temporary) James Douglas Campbell (79162), Royal Regiment of Artillery.
- No. 7815615 Warrant Officer Class I Frank Cannings, Corps of Military Police (India).
- Major (acting Colonel) Walter John Cantell (46679), Corps of Royal Engineers.
- No. 6975172 Warrant Officer Class II Bernard Joseph Carabine, The Royal Inniskilling Fusiliers.
- Senior Commander (temporary) Mary Elizabeth Carey (192384), Auxiliary Territorial Service.
- Captain Lewis Victor Carter (107512), Royal Army Pay Corps.
- No. 7248976 Warrant Officer Class I Robert Catchpole, The Army Dental Corps.
- No. S/886542 Warrant Officer Class I Arthur Cattley, Royal Army Service Corps.
- No. 731074 Warrant Officer Class I Thomas Henry Challen, Army Physical Training Corps.
- Captain (Quartermaster) Cyril Chaplin (62809), The East Lancashire Regiment.
- Major (temporary) Henry Hartley Chappell (63137), Corps of Royal Engineers.
- Captain Bhup Singh Chhikara, Army in India Reserve of Officers.
- Major (temporary) John Norton Chivers (126311), Corps of Royal Engineers.
- No. 7536280 Warrant Officer Class II John Raymond Church, The Army Dental Corps.
- Captain (Quartermaster) Charles William Churcher (77495), Extra Regimentally Employed List.
- Major (temporary) James Edward Clarke (175786) Royal Army Service Corps.
- No. 7012234 Warrant Officer Class II William Clarke, The Royal Ulster Rifles.
- Major (acting) William Edward Clarke (216147), The King's Own Malta Regiment.
- Major (temporary) Nathan Alfred Cecil Clubb (147169), Royal Corps of Signals.
- No. 1023113 Warrant Officer Class II Victor Cyril Coates, Royal Regiment of Artillery.
- Captain (temporary) Christopher Norman Cobb (264537), The Northamptonshire Regiment.
- Major (temporary) Martin Youatt Cobb (129057), Royal Regiment of Artillery.
- Major (temporary) Kenneth Desmond Coe (274891), Corps of Royal Engineers.
- Captain (Quartermaster) Robert Edward Richard Coleman (110143), Royal Regiment of Artillery.
- Major (temporary) Geoffrey Beare Rexar Cook (69167), Royal Army Service Corps.
- Lieutenant Harold Ernest Coombes (323632), Royal Army Service Corps.
- No. 5718557 Warrant Officer Class II Lawrence George Coombes, The Hampshire Regiment.
- Major (temporary) Alfred William Cooper (131473), The King's Regiment (Liverpool).
- Lieutenant-Colonel (temporary) Francis Thomas Copeland, Specially Employed List, Indian Army.
- Major (temporary) William Sinclair Corken (118977), Royal Army Ordnance Corps.
- Captain (temporary) Ralph Welsley Couldrey (244394), Intelligence Corps.
- Major (temporary) (Quartermaster) John Coulter (69399), The Duke of Wellington's Regiment (West Riding).
- Major (temporary) Henry Burt Cowell (167459), Royal Army Ordnance Corps.
- No. 7259279 Warrant Officer Class I John Alfred Cox, Royal Army Medical Corps.
- Lieutenant-Colonel (acting) John Bogie Craig (E.C.279), 10th Baluch Regiment, Indian Army.
- Major Thomas Richard Crawford (178190), General List.
- Major (temporary) John Andrew Crichton (98956), The Gordon Highlanders.
- Major (temporary) Ronald Murray Haven Crofts (91476), Royal Regiment of Artillery.
- Major (temporary) Derrick Norrington Cronin (66597), The Worcestershire Regiment.
- No. 4908431 Warrant Officer Class I Joseph Crosby, The South Staffordshire Regiment.
- Lieutenant-Colonel (temporary) William Francis Crotty (169930), 14th/20th King's Hussars, Royal Armoured Corps, attached Fighting Vehicles School.
- No. 1926755 Warrant Officer Class I Arthur Leslie Cruddas, Corps of Royal Engineers.
- Major (temporary) Andrew John Maxton Cruickshank (176857), The Royal Welch Fusiliers.
- Major (temporary) William Henry Cummings (E.8825), Royal Indian Army Service Corps.
- Captain (temporary) John William Cummins (E.C.7900), 7th Gurkha Rifles, Indian Army.
- Major (temporary) Alured Phayre Cuningham (Retd.), late Indian Army.
- Major (temporary) Eric Dalton (121968), Corps of Royal Engineers.
- Captain (Quartermaster) Arthur Frank Dangerfield (154937), Corps of Royal Engineers.
- Major (temporary) John Davey (89544), Royal Regiment of Artillery.
- Major (temporary) Alfred Harry Davidson (104161), Corps of Royal Engineers.
- Major (temporary) John Emerson Harding Davies (155112), Royal Army Service Corps.
- No. 1886678 Warrant Officer Class I Stanley Davies, Corps of Royal Engineers.
- No. 3648381 Warrant Officer Class I Samuel Henry Davies, The South Lancashire Regiment (The Prince of Wales's Volunteers).
- Captain (Quartermaster) Robert Davis (85877), The South Staffordshire Regiment.
- No. 2656588 Warrant Officer Class II Albert Edward Davison, Coldstream Guards.
- Major (temporary) George Edward Davison (122584), Pioneer Corps.
- Major (temporary) George Frederick Dawes (167928), Corps of Royal Engineers.
- No. 2609814 Warrant Officer Class I Benjamin Deakin, Grenadier Guards.
- Major (temporary) Henry Gordon Dean, DSO, TD, (21803), Royal Regiment of Artillery.
- Major (temporary) Seton Hedley Dearden (217267), Royal Armoured Corps.
- Major (temporary) (Quartermaster) Bernard Cousins Debenham (116498), Royal Army Medical Corps.
- Major (temporary) William Gardner Denness (237052), Pioneer Corps.
- Captain (temporary) Frank Dennis (E.C.12482), Indian Army Ordnance Corps.
- Major (temporary) (Quartermaster) David Mitchell Dewar (322984), General List, Infantry.
- Captain (temporary) Francis Edwin Dias (M.Z.6618), Indian Army Medical Corps.
- Major (temporary) John Richard Dibb (145709), Royal Regiment of Artillery.
- Captain (temporary) Alexander Graeme Dickson (102990), The Queen's Own Cameron Highlanders.
- Major (temporary) Murray Deighton Dixon (I.E.C. 534), Indian Signal Corps.
- No. S/88725 Warrant Officer Class I James Scott Docherty, Royal Army Service Corps.
- Major (temporary) Norman Ross Doling (164635), The East Lancashire Regiment.
- No. 5987851 Warrant Officer Class I Frederick Charles Donovan, The Middlesex Regiment (Duke of Cambridge's Own).
- Major (temporary) Frank Russell Dore (108302), Special List (TARO).
- Lieutenant-Colonel (temporary) Basil Evelyn Draper (841.I.A.), Indian Army.
- Major (temporary) Derek Astley Drayson (151877), Royal Regiment of Artillery.
- Major (temporary) Harold Dudley, AMIEE, (88943), Royal Corps of Signals.
- Major Henry Crawford Dunlop (149178), The Royal Northumberland Fusiliers.
- Captain (temporary) Gordon William Dunnett (154309), Corps of Royal Engineers.
- Major (temporary) Richard Henry Philip Lowndes Durham (121153), Corps of Royal Engineers.
- Lieutenant-Colonel (temporary) Leon Frederick Duval (106353), Royal Army Ordnance Corps
- Major (temporary) Frank Leslie Eaton (62338), The Manchester Regiment.
- Captain (temporary) William Charles Eatwell (159367), The Royal Berkshire Regiment (Princess Charlotte of Wales's).
- Major (temporary) Edward Basil Edmunds (109359), Royal Regiment of Artillery.
- Junior Commander (temporary) Ethel Mary Edwards (192123), Auxiliary Territorial Service.
- Lieutenant-Colonel (temporary) John Else (53858), Royal Army Service Corps, attached Royal Indian Army Service Corps.
- Captain (temporary) George Hugh Cavendish Emmett (124522), Royal Armoured Corps.
- Major (temporary) William Albert Erritt (342749), Corps of Royal Engineers.
- Major Eric Sydney Evans (186611V), South African Forces.
- Captain (acting Colonel) William Vincent John Evans (176999), Royal Regiment of Artillery.
- Major (temporary) Douglas William Falconer (99928), The East Yorkshire Regiment (The Duke of York's Own).
- Lieutenant-Colonel (temporary) John Sanders Falkner (34765), The Bedfordshire and Hertfordshire Regiment.
- Jemadar Farman Ali (10-21510), 6th Rajputana Rifles, Indian Army.
- Captain (Quartermaster) George Henry Farmer (134794), The Somerset Light Infantry (Prince Albert's).
- Lieutenant Walter George Fenton (114282), Pioneer Corps.
- Major (temporary) Edward Ferguson (76736), The Army Dental Corps.
- Major (temporary) Kenneth Leslie Ferguson (146476), Pioneer Corps.
- Subedar Major and Honorary Captain George Julian Ferris, Sardar Bahadur OBI, IOM, IDSM, Indian Army Medical Corps.
- Lieutenant-Colonel (temporary) Arthur William Henry Field (103369), Royal Army Ordnance Corps.
- No. 6190175 Warrant Officer Class II Albert Edward Finch, The Middlesex Regiment (Duke of Cambridge's Own).
- Major (temporary) David John Finlay (223260), Corps of Royal Engineers.
- No. S/130882 Warrant Officer Class I Douglas Richard Fisher, Royal Army Service Corps.
- Major (temporary) Stanley Edward Fisher (301949), General List.
- Lieutenant Walter Ronald Fishlock (350398), Royal Army Service Corps.
- Major (temporary) Richard Wallace Fleming (64149), The Black Watch (Royal Highland Regiment).
- Major (acting) Stanley Wilkinson Fleming (275681), Army Cadet Force.
- Major (temporary) Joseph Wiltshire Fletcher, Grenada Volunteer Force, Windward Islands.
- Captain (temporary) Peter Noel Fletcher (299274), Army Air Corps.
- Major (temporary) William Henry Fletcher, PASI, (188005), Corps of Royal Engineers.
- Lieutenant-Colonel (temporary) William Alfred Fordham (69402), Royal Army Ordnance Corps.
- Major (temporary) Thomas Forster (128616), Corps of Royal Engineers.
- Major (temporary) Geoffrey Joseph Forsyth (101099), Royal Army Pay Corps.
- Major (Quartermaster) George Foster (50041), Royal Regiment of Artillery.
- Captain Ernest Francis (199123), Royal Electrical and Mechanical Engineers.
- Senior Commander (temporary) Mary Margaret Elizabeth Fry (W.A.C.527), Women's Auxiliary Corps (India).
- No. 7583436 Warrant Officer Class I Francis George Fuller, Royal Army Ordnance Corps.
- Captain Henry Arthur Fuller (157453), Royal Corps of Signals.
- Major (temporary) Frederick Gordon Furniss (89412), Royal Army Service Corps.
- Junior Commander (temporary) Betty Fussey (250056), Auxiliary Territorial Service.
- Lieutenant-Colonel (temporary) Ashwathama Balacharya Gajendragadkar (Tf.307), 1st Bombay Battalion University Officers Training Corps, Indian Territorial Force.
- Jemadar Ganpat Ram Yadav (TY.1573), Royal Indian Army Service Corps.
- Major (temporary) Edward Stanley Gardner (21521), The South Lancashire Regiment (The Prince of Wales's Volunteers).
- Chief Commander (temporary) Kathleen Garland (W.A.C.112), Women's Auxiliary Corps (India).
- Junior Commander (temporary) Ailsa Elizabeth Garrett (234602), Auxiliary Territorial Service.
- Major (temporary) William Herbert Gatfield, MC, (152271), Royal Army Service Corps.
- Major (temporary) (Quartermaster) William Haughton Gaywood (85850), Extra Regimentally Employed List.
- Major (temporary) Michael Geogiadi (E.C. 866), 18th Royal Garhwal Rifles, Indian Army.
- Major (temporary) Ghulam Farid (I.E.C.1335), Indian Army.
- Major (temporary) James William Gibson (46313), The East Yorkshire Regiment (The Duke of York's Own).
- Lieutenant-Colonel (temporary) Derek Hammond Giles (E.C. 224), Indian Army Ordnance Corps.
- Captain (temporary) Ivor Algernon Walter Gilliat (37776), The Royal Berkshire Regiment (Princess Charlotte of Wales's).
- Major John Daniel Gingell (168445), General List.
- Captain (temporary) Girdhari Singh. (I.E.C.725), Jodhpur Lancers, Indian States Forces.
- Captain Robert Erskine Glen, MB, (246806), Royal Army Medical Corps.
- No. 2607493 Warrant Officer Class I Sydney Godlington, Royal Armoured Corps.
- Major (temporary) Frank Edward Godwin, MM, (136781), The Royal Berkshire Regiment (Princess Charlotte of Wales's).
- No. 2560272 Warrant Officer Class II James Goldie, Corps of Royal Engineers.
- No. 5172093 Warrant Officer Class II Oliver Thomas Gooding, Corps of Royal Engineers.
- Regimental Quartermaster-Sergeant James Francis Goodland, Newfoundland Regiment.
- No. S/67036 Warrant Officer Class II Arthur Charles Goodwin, BEM, Royal Army Service Corps.
- Major (temporary) Hugh Hanchard Goodwin (112316), Royal Army Service Corps.
- Junior Commander Ruth Monica Baring-Gould (257857), Auxiliary Territorial Service.
- Major (temporary) Ernest Frederic Graham, MC, (49019), Royal Regiment of Artillery.
- Major (temporary) Eric Walter Graham (186214), 1/8th Gurkha Rifles, attached Corps of Military Police (India).
- Major (temporary) Duncan Grant (115444), Intelligence Corps.
- Captain (temporary) John Michael Green (230115), Corps of Royal Engineers.
- Major (temporary) Oswald Egerton Green (171056), Royal Army Service Corps.
- Major (temporary) Robert Alan Green (62008), Royal Corps of Signals.
- Captain William James Forrester Green (134814), Royal Corps of Signals.
- Captain (temporary) Denis Stevens Greensmith (132990), Royal Regiment of Artillery.
- Captain (Quartermaster) George William Milton Greensted (230287), Corps of Royal Engineers.
- No. 10350056 Warrant Officer Class II Kenneth Edmund Greenwood, Intelligence Corps.
- Lieutenant (Quartermaster) Thomas Henry Greig (E.C.5601), Indian Signal Corps.
- Lieutenant-Colonel (temporary) Dudley Stewart Gribble (48359), Corps of Royal Engineers.
- Lieutenant-Colonel (temporary) Frank William Griffin (E.C.3263), Indian Army Ordnance Corps.
- Major (temporary) Joseph Davies Griffiths (65064), Royal Regiment of Artillery.
- Captain (temporary) Gurdarshan Singh (I.E.C.7426), Royal Indian Army Service Corps.
- Major (temporary) Gurdial Singh Grewal (I.E.C.11998), Patiala Lancers, Indian States Forces.
- Major (Quartermaster) Claude Leonard Gyde, DCM, (41959), Royal Army Service Corps.
- Captain (local Lieutenant-Colonel) Douglas Christopher Hamilton, MC, (97830), Corps of Royal Engineers.
- Senior Commander Muriel Beatrice Hammond, Auxiliary Territoriai Service (Ceylon).
- Major (temporary) Christopher Lionel Hanbury, TD, (35403), Royal Regiment of Artillery.
- Major (temporary) George Charles Hann (32792), Corps of Royal Engineers.
- Captain (temporary) Eric Hannah (160905), The Dorsetshire Regiment.
- Major (temporary) Eric Gashry Granville Hanrott (151705), Intelligence Corps.
- Major (temporary) John Blair Hardie (78389), The Army Dental Corps.
- Major (temporary) Patrick Graham Harding (156828), Army Air Corps.
- No. 5331411 Warrant Officer Class I Wallace Harris, The Royal Berkshire Regiment (Princess Charlotte of Wales's).
- No. 1416831 Warrant Officer Class I Albert Ernest Harrison, Royal Regiment of Artillery.
- Lieutenant-Colonel (temporary) Arthur Trevor Harrison (78935), Royal Regiment of Artillery.
- Major (temporary) Kenneth Cecil Harrison (237639), The West Yorkshire Regiment (The Prince of Wales's Own).
- Major (temporary) Lemon Evelyn Oliver Turton Hart (137946), The Rifle Brigade (Prince Consort's Own).
- Lieutenant-Colonel (temporary) Cecil John Hathaway (A.I.568), 14th Punjab Regiment, Indian Army.
- Captain (temporary) Thomas Hawkins (ST.70), Royal Indian Army Service Corps.
- Major (temporary) Denis Hayes (90465), Royal Corps of Signals.
- No. 1059471 Warrant Officer Class I Ronald Hayman, Royal Army Veterinary Corps.
- Major (temporary) Eric James Haywood, The Worcestershire Regiment, Second in Command of British Guiana Garrison.
- Lieutenant-Colonel (temporary) Sydney Haydn Heard (MZ.18274), Indian Army Medical Corps.
- Major (temporary) George Frederick Hemley (75425), Royal Army. Service Corps.
- Major (temporary) Robert Hening (120093), Corps of Royal Engineers.
- Major (temporary) Frank Brian Hewer (86105), Royal Army Service Corps.
- Major Thomas Lawson Hewson, TD, (38193), The Border Regiment.
- No. 2321591 Warrant Officer Class II John Nicholson Higgins, Royal Corps of Signals.
- Junior Commander (temporary) Alma Vernon Hildyard (225126), Auxiliary Territorial Service.
- No. 316906 Warrant Officer Class I Stanley Hill, Royal Armoured Corps.
- Major (temporary) Richard Arthur Loraine Hillard (123606), Royal Army Service Corps.
- Major (temporary) Charles Carling Hamilton Hipgrave, PASI, (131228), Corps of Royal Engineers.
- Major (temporary) Geoffrey Frederick Robert Hirst, MC, (59163), Grenadier Guards.
- No. S/5679077 Warrant Officer Class I (acting) Thomas Frederick Hiskey, Royal Army Service Corps.
- Captain (Quartermaster) Robert Justin Pipon Hodges (195322), Corps of Royal Engineers.
- Major (acting) Richard Arthur Shuttleworth Holden (75818), The Oxfordshire and Buckinghamshire Light Infantry.
- Major (temporary) Dennis Patrick Holmes (137214), The Rifle Brigade (Prince Consort's Own).
- Major (temporary) Patrick Edward Michael Holmes (E.G.4939), Indian Engineers.
- No. 7687977 Warrant Officer Class II Frederick Sydney Charles Hooker, Corps of Military Police.
- Major Walter Sydney Hooker, TD, (7592), The Queen's Royal Regiment (West Surrey).
- Major (Quartermaster) Arthur George Hooley (33921), Corps of Royal Engineers.
- No. S/181007 Warrant Officer Class I Leslie Frederick Hooper, Royal Army Service Corps.
- No. 11234 Warrant Officer Class II Thomas Arthur Hosking, Corps of Royal Engineers.
- Major (temporary) David Richard Howells (141558), The Welch Regiment.
- Captain (temporary) Richard Hoyle (50422), Corps of Royal Engineers.
- Major (acting) Adin Hull (244409), Corps of Royal Engineers.
- Lieutenant John Collier Hunt (295550), Corps of Royal Engineers.
- Junior Commander (temporary) Rosemary Alice Ilott (196110), Auxiliary Territorial Service.
- No. 4448368 Warrant Officer Class II Stanley Eric Imrie, The East Yorkshire Regiment (The Duke of York's Own).
- Major (temporary) Joan Katherine Somerville Ince (192090), Royal Army Medical Corps.
- Major (temporary) Alan Maundret Ingram (129099), The Sherwood Foresters (Nottinghamshire and Derbyshire Regiment).
- Major (temporary) Charles Rupert Instone (142961), Royal Armoured Corps.
- No. 7741 Warrant Officer Class II William Izzo, The King's Own Malta Regiment.
- Major (temporary) Henry Robert Jackson (210634), Royal Electrical and Mechanical Engineers.
- No. 7593392 Warrant Officer Class I John Frederick Jackson, Royal Army Ordnance Corps.
- Lieutenant-Colonel (temporary) Ralph Jackson (33953), Royal Corps of Signals.
- Captain (Quartermaster) Vincent Jacques (79830), The Cheshire Regiment.
- Major (temporary) Trilok Chand Jaini (R.O.2937), Army in India Reserve of Officers.
- Lieutenant-Colonel (temporary) George Henry James (185768), Royal Army Service Corps, attached Royal Indian Army Service Corps.
- Captain Donald George Jarrard (I.A.926), "Special List" of Quartermasters of the Indian Army, attached 12th Frontier Force Regiment, Indian Army.
- Major (temporary) Alliston Arthur Jeacock (134528), General List.
- Major (temporary) Ernest Herbert Jeffries, MC, (118533) Royal Regiment of Artillery.
- No. 49323 Warrant Officer Class I William Jelley, Royal Electrical and Mechanical Engineers.
- Major (Quartermaster) Edward James Jenkins (28362), Corps of Royal Engineers.
- No. 7650398 Warrant Officer Class I Gordon Eaton Jenkins, Royal Army Ordnance Corps.
- Major (temporary) Kenneth Almeida Martin-Jenkins (212089), Royal Corps of Signals.
- Lieutenant-Colonel (temporary) William Richard Jenney (I.A.724), Indian Army.
- Major (temporary) Frederick Leonard Johnson (92627), General List.
- Major (temporary) William Ernest Johnston (118952), Royal Electrical and Mechanical Engineers.
- Major (temporary) Adrian Neil Jones (152749), Royal Army Ordnance Corps.
- Junior Commander (temporary) Betty Irene Shera-Jones (W.A.C.379), Women's Auxiliary Corps (India).
- Major (temporary) Charles Henry Lloyd-Jones (107157), The Royal Welch Fusiliers.
- Captain (Quartermaster) Geoffrey Jones (211503), General List.
- No. 7590079 Warrant Officer Class I Kenneth Jones, Royal Army Ordnance Corps.
- Major (temporary) Robert Charles Jones (E.C.5626), Intelligence Corps (India).
- No. 2730034 Warrant Officer Class II Tom Jones, Welsh Guards.
- Captain Ronald Arthur Dixon Kable, Fiji Military Forces.
- Captain Robert Keal (149274) The East Yorkshire Regiment (The Duke of York's Own).
- Major (temporary) Ronald Keen (134886), Royal Corps of Signals.
- Captain (temporary) John Anderson Kelly, The Royal Fusiliers (City of London Regiment), attached Royal Indian Army Service Corps.
- Lieutenant-Colonel (temporary) Arthur Richard Kemsley, Probyn's Horse, Indian Armoured Corps.
- Lieutenant John Kennington (203571), Corps of Royal Engineers.
- Lieutenant-Colonel (temporary) Kenneth Lionel Kershaw (E.C.65), 4th Bombay Grenadiers, Indian Army.
- Major (temporary) Benjamin John Ketchlee (28435), The Devonshire Regiment.
- Captain (temporary) John Musgrave King (124620), Royal Regiment of Artillery.
- Lieutenant-Colonel Archibald Henry Robert Montgomery Laird, MC, (I.A.483), Royal Indian Army Service Corps.
- Major (temporary) Stephen Lambert (155810), Royal Corps of Signals.
- Major (temporary) Bruce Langley (178214), General List.
- Lieutenant-Colonel (acting) Clive Hamilton Lawrance (1252501), South African Forces.
- Major (temporary) John Learmont (162068), Intelligence Corps.
- Major i(temporary) Richard Learmonth (E.C.12141), Indian Army.
- Captain (temporary) James Vernon Lee, MC, (133695), The Royal Sussex Regiment.
- Major (temporary) Robert Ernest Moffatt Lee, MM, (87905), Royal Regiment of Artillery.
- No. S/1452813 Warrant Officer Class I Harry Leibling, Royal Army Service Corps.
- Lieutenant-Colonel (temporary) Hexell Arthur Lewis, TD, BSc (Eng.), MIEE, (52291), Royal Electrical and Mechanical Engineers.
- Major (temporary) Ernest Walter Lines (53789), Royal Army Pay Corps.
- Captain (Quartermaster) Montague Lipton (252422), General List.
- Major (temporary) John Leopard Loades (E.C.8855), Indian Army Ordnance Corps.
- Lieutenant-Colonel (temporary) Arthur William Long (5933), The East Lancashire Regiment (Reserve of Officers), attached Indian Army Ordnance Corps.
- Captain (Quartermaster) William Love (93594), The Border Regiment.
- No. 798701 Warrant Officer Class I Alec Lumb, Royal Regiment of Artillery.
- Captain Idonia Muriel Lynch, Southern Rhodesia Women's Auxiliary Military Service.
- Major (temporary) Henry Stephen Lyons (E.G.1822), 11th Sikh Regiment, Indian Army.
- The Reverend John MacGregor Mackechnie, MA, (111088), Chaplain to the Forces, Fourth Class, Royal Army Chaplains' Department.
- The Reverend George Mackenzie, BA, (65258), Chaplain to the Forces, Third Class (temporary), Royal Army Chaplains' Department.
- Major (temporary) Ivor Mackenzie Macleod, (E.G.9095), Indian Engineers.
- Major (temporary) Cecil Distin Byng-Maddick (124941), Royal Army Service Corps.
- Captain (Quartermaster) Samuel Maddocks (78355) Royal Regiment of Artillery.
- Major (temporary) Ernest Major (91683), Royal Tank Regiment, Royal Armoured Corps.
- Major (temporary) Richard Frederick Adrian Mallinson (182447), Royal Regiment of Artillery.
- Major (temporary) James Frederick Manley (318176), General List.
- Subedar Mansabdar Khan (GSV/602), Indian General Service Corps.
- Regimental Sergeant Major Manuella, Gilbert and Ellice Islands, Labour Corps.
- Major (temporary) Eric Victor Hoffumy Marcus (42775), Royal Regiment of Artillery.
- Major (temporary) Peter Hugh Cox Martin (129847), Corps of Royal Engineers.
- Major (temporary) Sidney Douglas Martin (CC/143), Indian Army Corps of Clerks.
- Subedar Major Maruti Zabri, 5th Mahratta Light Infantry, Indian Army.
- Captain Kenneth Mason (56491), General List.
- Major (temporary) John Maitland Maxwell (94445), Corps of Royal Engineers.
- No. 5239927 Warrant Officer Class II Percy May, The Oxfordshire and Buckinghamshire Light Infantry.
- Captain (Quartermaster) Leonard John Mays, (179789), Royal Regiment, of Artillery.
- Captain (local Major) James Kenneth McConnell, DSO, MC, (1188), General List.
- Junior Commander (temporary) Fiona McCrae (192809), Auxiliary Territorial Service.
- No. 7645889 Warrant Officer Class II William Armour McGeachy, Royal Electrical and Mechanical Engineers.
- No. 1857324 Warrant Officer Class I Charles McKinnon, Royal Corps of Signals.
- No. S/103097 Warrant Officer Class I George Arthur McLeod, Royal Army Service Corps.
- No. 2324606 Warrant Officer Class II David Graham McMurray, Corps of Royal Engineers.
- No. 2691548 Warrant Officer Class I Robert Louis McNally, Scots Guards.
- Major (temporary) Robert Thomas Mitchell McPhail, (143033), Royal Regiment of Artillery.
- Major (acting) (Quartermaster) William James Meaden (131824), The Sherwood Foresters (Nottinghamshire and Derbyshire Regiment).
- Junior Commander (temporary) Margaret Menzies-Menzies (196164), Auxiliary Territorial Service.
- Captain (temporary) William George Merry (E.C.8055), Indian Army.
- Major (temporary) Alexander Douglas Merson (137484), The Royal Scots Fusiliers.
- Major (temporary) William Blackwood Michael (127218), Royal Army Service Corps.
- Subaltern Marion Lewis Micklewright (270250), Auxiliary Territorial Service.
- Captain (Quartermaster) Herbert Cornelius Miles (106550), Royal Tank Regiment, Royal Armoured Corps.
- Junior Commander (temporary) Eugenie Violet Millar, (244934), Auxiliary Territorial Service.
- No. 7610220 Warrant Officer Class I Roland Kitchener Millard, Royal Army Ordnance Corps.
- Major (temporary) Robert Joseph Miller (159739), Royal Regiment of Artillery.
- Captain (temporary) William Sidney Mobley (188479), Corps of Royal Engineers.
- Major Mohammad Umar Khan, Rajpipla State Forces, Indian States Forces.
- Major (temporary) Arthur Robert Moore, MM, (22894), Pioneer Corps.
- Major (temporary) Frank Leslie Morgan, MC, (49194), Corps of Royal Engineers.
- Lieutenant Thomas Owen Morris, MSc, (163991), Corps of Royal Engineers.
- Principal Matron (acting) Olga Dorothy Mylan, ARCC, (N.Z. 2546), Indian Military Nursing Service.
- No. W/27616 Warrant Officer Class II Margaret Lucy Pope, Auxiliary Territorial Service.
- Captain Narain Singh, MC, Sardar Bahadur OBI, IDSM, Faridkot State Forces, Indian State Forces.
- Captain (temporary) Narindar Singh (I.E.C. 750), Indian Army.
- Major (Quartermaster) Frederick George Newall (47921), The King's Own Yorkshire Light Infantry.
- No. 1048469 Warrant Officer Class II Thomas Arthur George Newman, Royal Regiment of Artillery.
- No. 6687814 Warrant Officer Class I William Harold Newman, The King's Royal Rifle Corps.
- Captain (Quartermaster) Eric Stanley Nicholls (152560), The Life Guards.
- Major (temporary) Sir Humphrey Brunei Noble, Bt, MC, (25587), Royal Regiment of Artillery.
- Major Ernest John Norris (11690), Royal Army Ordnance Corps.
- Captain (temporary) Otto Nyquist (194499), Royal Regiment of Artillery.
- Major (temporary) Maurice Oldfield (281336), Intelligence Corps.
- Captain John Robert Osborne, Adjutant, Gilbert and Ellice Islands Labour Corps.
- Major Thomas Cary Owtram, MC, (111120), Royal Regiment of Artillery.
- Lieutenant-Colonel (temporary) Norman Stanley Oxford (99250), Royal Army Ordnance Corps.
- Major (temporary) Alan Thomas Page (130756), The Royal Ulster Rifles.
- Major (temporary) John Arthur Papps (7792), Royal Indian Army Service Corps.
- Lieutenant-Colonel (temporary) Eric Parkinson (214859), Royal Army Ordnance Corps.
- Major (temporary) Thomas Edgar Parslow (42355), Army Educational Corps.
- Lieutenant James Parsons (150235), The Cameronians (Scottish Rifles).
- No. 7601626 Warrant Officer Class I Charles Edward Paskins, Royal Electrical and Mechanical Engineers, attached Indian Electrical and Mechanical Engineers.
- Captain (Quartermaster) Leslie John Harry Payne (236595), General List.
- The Reverend Reginald Merac La Porte-Payne, TD, MA, (50168), Chaplain to the Forces, Third Class, Royal Army Chaplains' Department.
- Lieutenant-Colonel (temporary) John Walter Pearce (173542), Royal Army Ordnance Corps.
- Major (temporary) Gerald Vyvyan Pearse, MC, (102242), Royal Regiment of Artillery.
- Captain Ronald Francis Edward Wayte Peel (110929), Corps of Royal Engineers.
- Major (temporary) John Alfred Tarsisius Perera, Ceylon Garrison Artillery.
- No. 4445530 Warrant Officer Class I Cyril Kingston Picknett, Small Arms School Corps.
- Major (temporary) Ronald Norris Pink (169927), Corps of Royal Engineers.
- No. 1410666 Warrant Officer Class I Robert James Pitcher, Royal Regiment of Artillery.
- Major (temporary) Richard Owen Porter, TD, (49091), Corps of Royal Engineers.
- Major (acting) William Porter (169322), Corps of Royal Engineers.
- No.S/7668073 Warrant Officer Class I Stanley Potter, Royal Army Service Corps.
- Captain Eric Rollo Pound (45411), The Dorsetshire Regiment.
- No. 7597467 Warrant Officer Class II Frank Povey, Royal Army Ordnance Corps.
- Captain Patrick Francis Power (E.G.4286), "Special List" of Quartermasters of the Indian Army, attached 6th Gurkha Rifles, Indian Army.
- Captain (temporary) Prem Singh, 12th Frontier Force Regiment, Indian Army.
- Major (temporary) James Henry Preston (114468), Royal Army Ordnance Corps.
- Lieutenant Thomas Geddes Proctor, "Special List" of Quartermasters of the Indian Army.
- Captain (temporary) Rabnawaz Khan (I.E.C. 9092), 1st Punjab Regiment, Indian Army.
- Lieutenant-Colonel (temporary) Joseph Aloysius O'Connor (39752), The Army Dental Corps.
- Captain (temporary) Leon James Radford (VUL/1), Indian Army Veterinary Corps.
- Captain (temporary) Raghuvendra Singh, Indian Armoured Corps.
- Major (temporary) (Quartermaster) Stanley Raim (94935), Royal Army Service Corps.
- Captain (temporary) Trivadi Ramachandra (I.E.C.1011), Indian Army.
- Lieutenant-Colonel (temporary) Frank Johahness Rasmussen (A.I.R.O.2053), Army in India Reserve of Officers, attached 14th Punjab Regiment, Indian Army.
- Captain (temporary) John Charles Rawet (245188), Royal Army Ordnance Corps.
- Captain (temporary) A. Razzaq (E.C.12), 9th Jat Regiment, Indian Army.
- Major (temporary) George Nathaniel Rebello (I.E.C.2853), Indian Engineers (Army Postal Service).
- Captain William Renshaw, Newfoundland Regiment.
- Lieutenant-Colonel (temporary) Peter William Ricardo (107116), Royal Army Ordnance Corps.
- Lieutenant-Colonel (temporary) James Frederick Rice (68938), Royal Electrical and Mechanical Engineers, attached Indian Electrical and Mechanical Engineers.
- Major (temporary) William George Leonard Rice (59906), The Worcestershire Regiment.
- Major (temporary) Gordon William Humphreys Richardson (91612), Royal Regiment of Artillery.
- No. 2308715 Warrant Officer Class I Harry Ring, Royal Corps of Signals.
- Major (temporary) William George Riley (CC/155), Indian Army Corps of Clerks.
- Senior Commander (temporary) Mary Dorothy Rittner (196301), Auxiliary Territorial Service.
- Major Frederick William Roberts (23148), Corps of Royal Engineers.
- No. 5946825 Warrant Officer Class I Herbert Roberts, The Bedfordshire and Hertfordshire Regiment.
- Major John Bruce Robertson (23888), The Gordon Highlanders.
- Major Louis De Carmo Robertson (16649), The East Lancashire Regiment.
- Lieutenant-Colonel (temporary) Stanley Colston Robins (I.A.827), Royal Indian Army Service Corps.
- Major (temporary) Reginald Edgar Rodaway (94844), Royal Corps of Signals.
- No. T/44543 Warrant Officer Class I Charles Harry Ridgwell Rogers, Royal Army Service Corps.
- Major (temporary) Victor Milton Rowland (1433), New Zealand Military Forces.
- Major (temporary) John Derek Guy Russell (155753), Royal Corps of Signals.
- Captain (Quartermaster) Benjamin Charles Ryan (282539), The King's Royal Rifle Corps.
- Lieutenant Henry Anthony Rydings (264568), Corps of Royal Engineers.
- Major (acting) Jeffrey George Joseph Samuels, BSc, (91241), Royal Corps of Signals.
- Captain (temporary) John Kerwick Glenn Sarjeant, ARIBA, (248596), Corps of Royal Engineers.
- No. 5823566 Warrant Officer Class I George Sartain, Pioneer Corps.
- Captain (temporary) John Niedieck Savory (92440), Royal Regiment of Artillery.
- Major (temporary) Aubrey William Schuster (120223), Royal Army Service Corps.
- Lieutenant (Quartermaster) Arthur Edgar Scovell (305202), Corps of Royal Engineers.
- No. 6133666 Warrant Officer Class I Arthur Reginald Scriven, The East Surrey Regiment.
- Major (temporary) William George Scruby (255647), Pioneer Corps.
- Major (Quartermaster) George William Sellex, MC, (9861), Royal Army Medical Corps.
- Major (temporary) Cecil Sessions (137436), The Buffs (Royal East Kent Regiment).
- Major (temporary) Alastair George Sharp (85797), The Gordon Highlanders.
- Major (temporary) Frank Howard Shaw (74802), The Devonshire Regiment.
- No. 7897658 Warrant Officer Class II Joseph Shaw, Royal Armoured Corps.
- Captain (local Major) Jack William Shaw (31196), The Oxfordshire and Buckinghamshire Light Infantry.
- Major (temporary) John Vivian Shelby (78682), Royal Regiment of Artillery.
- Major Sheo Prasad Singh, Datia State Forces, Indian States Forces.
- Major (temporary) Michael Francis Sherwin (130772), The Buffs (Royal East Kent Regiment).
- Senior Commander (temporary) Patricia Mary Shiel (196420), Auxiliary Territorial Service.
- Major (temporary) Raymond Edward Laws Shingles, 9th Jat Regiment, Indian Army.
- Major (acting) Arthur Lewis Shipp (263059), General List.
- Major (temporary) Alfred John Shipton, MC, (135173), The Royal Berkshire Regiment (Princess Charlotte of Wales's).
- Lieutenant Charles Leonard Shrimpton (312216), Corps of Royal Engineers (since killed in action).
- Major (temporary) Rai Saheb Julian Oscar Nathan Shukla, Army in India Reserve of Officers, attached Intelligence Corps (India).
- No. 1926361 Warrant Officer Class I David Simmonds, Corps of Royal Engineers.
- Major (temporary) Norman George Eric Sims (66801), Royal Regiment of Artillery.
- Lieutenant Arthur George Skinner (201257), Corps of Royal Engineers.
- Major (temporary) Albert Edward Smith (114180), Corps of Royal Engineers.
- Major (temporary) Donald William Rait Smith (31390), The Royal Scots Fusiliers.
- Captain (Quartermaster) Harry Frederick Samuel Smith (114304), The South Lancashire Regiment (The Prince of Wales's Volunteers).
- Captain (temporary) Kenneth Roberts Smith (116206), The Black Watch (Royal Highland Regiment).
- No. T11 Warrant Officer Class II R. C. Smith, Bermuda Militia Artillery.
- Major (temporary) Reginald Gladstone Smith (66765), Royal Army Pay Corps.
- Lieutenant-Colonel (temporary) McDermot Gyton Smyth (73942), Royal Electrical and Mechanical Engineers.
- Major (temporary) Arthur Chaplain Snowden (108726), The Royal Berkshire Regiment (Princess Charlotte of Wales's).
- Major (temporary) Stanley James Raymond Sprigge (53917), The Queen's Royal Regiment (West Surrey).
- Junior Commander (temporary) Madeline Susan Stainforth (244857), Auxiliary Territorial Service.
- Lieutenant (Quartermaster) Charles Harry John Stammer (279579), The Queen's Royal Regiment (West Surrey).
- Lieutenant-Colonel (temporary) Norman Standish, Army in India Reserve of Officers, attached Intelligence Corps (India).
- Major (temporary) Eric Daykin Stanhope, (79116), The Army Dental Corps.
- Lieutenant-Colonel (temporary) Henry Kenneth Stanley (127532), Royal Army Ordnance Corps.
- Major (temporary) Eric Percy Stanton, BSc, AMIEE, (51992), Royal Corps of Signals.
- Junior Commander (temporary) Eileen Maud Stead (287321), Auxiliary Territorial Service.
- Captain (temporary) Archibald Whitfield Keith-Steele (16582 ), The Loyal Regiment (North Lancashire).
- Major (temporary) Charles Henry Stelfox (O.S.353), Indian Army Ordnance Corps.
- Lieutenant-Colonel (temporary) Francis Joseph Charles Stephenson (125451), Royal Army Ordnance Corps.
- No. 1551615 Warrant Officer Class II William Arnot Stevenson, Royal Regiment of Artillery.
- Captain (temporary) Melville Percival Stewart (191441V), South African Forces.
- No. 1985804 Warrant Officer Class II Walter Leslie Stocks, Corps of Royal Engineers.
- Captain (Quartermaster) Douglas Edmond McKerron Stokoe (125623), Royal Army Service Corps.
- No. 809283 Warrant Officer Class I Thomas Sydney Stollery, Indian Army Ordnance Corps.
- Major (temporary) Harry Stott (170645), Royal Army Service Corps, attached Royal Indian Army Service Corps.
- No. 2605738 Warrant Officer Class II Walter Clarence Stubbs, Grenadier Guards.
- Lieutenant-Colonel (temporary) Walter Rippon Stubbs (115431), Royal Army Ordnance Corps.
- Major (temporary) Arthur William Suddaby (176492), Reconnaissance Corps, Royal Armoured Corps.
- Major (temporary) Philip Roy Suffolk (E.C.4903), 5th Mahratta Light Infantry, Indian Army.
- Major Donald William Sutthery (10008) (Retd.), late The Seaforth Highlanders (Ross-shire Buffs, The Duke of Albany's).
- Brevet Major Charles Lexington Manners Sutton (8035), The Royal Fusiliers (City of London Regiment).
- Major (temporary) William John Symons (E.C.12317), "Special List" of Quartermasters of the Indian Army.
- Subedar Major and Honorary Captain Taj Mohammad Khan, Sardar Bahadur, OBI, 4th Bombay Grenadiers, Indian Army.
- Captain (temporary) Harold Ernest Frank Tant (167297), Royal Corps of Signals.
- Lieutenant William Arthur Taverner (291827), Corps of Royal Engineers.
- Captain (temporary) Stanley Leslie Tayler (149483), The Queen's Royal Regiment (West Surrey).
- Lieutenant-Colonel (temporary) Geoffrey Whitworth Taylor (E.G.2581), Indian Army.
- Lieutenant-Colonel (temporary) Noel Leigh Taylor (111910), Royal Army Service Corps.
- Major (Quartermaster) Thomas Charles Taylor, MM, (39379). The Cameronians (Scottish Rifles).
- Lieutenant-Colonel (temporary) Valentine Colebrook Lilly Taylor (I.A.1388), Indian Army.
- Major (temporary) Gerald Alfred Thesiger (171445). Extra-Regimentally Employed List.
- Major (acting) Edwin Henry Thomas (64599), The Lancashire Fusiliers.
- Senior Commander (temporary) Dorothy Mary Thomason (W.A.C.1017), Women's Auxiliary Corps (India).
- No. 406273 Warrant Officer Class I George Thompson, Royal Armoured Corps.
- No. 2057605 Warrant Officer Class II Thomas Arthur Tippetts, Royal Regiment of Artillery.
- Captain (Quartermaster) Ralph James Tomlinson (238303), Royal Army Service Corps.
- Major (temporary) Christopher John Chenevix-Trench (168591), Army Educational Corps.
- Major (temporary) Lionel Edgar Trueman, MM, Special List of Quartermasters of the Indian Army.
- No. 2693538 Warrant Officer Class I Edwin Turbitt, Corps of Military Police.
- Major (temporary) Dudley George Usher, TD, (35611), Royal Regiment of Artillery.
- No. X219 Warrant Officer Class I (acting) Henry Coenraad Van Der Linden, The King's African Rifles.
- No. S/1888023 Warrant Officer Class I (acting) Percy James Thomas Vayro, Royal Army Service Corps.
- Lieutenant Donald Charles Travers Venn, (327534), Corps of Royal Engineers.
- No. 970536 Warrant Officer Class II William Venters, Royal Regiment of Artillery.
- Major (acting) Christopher Arthur Vian (42710), Coldstream Guards.
- Junior Commander (temporary) Joane Suzanne Vivian (196493), Auxiliary Territorial Service.
- No. 4341586 Warrant Officer Class II Leslie Wadsworth, The East Yorkshire Regiment (The Duke of York's Own).
- Captain (temporary) Gordon Waight, 18th Royal Garhwal Rifles, Indian Army.
- Chief Commander (temporary) Mabel Alice Wainwright (W.A.C.345), Women's Auxiliary Corps (India).
- Major Albert Edward Walker (100058), Royal Regiment of Artillery.
- Major (acting) Christopher George Walker (183669), Royal Army Pay Corps.
- Major (temporary) Richard Herbert Walker, (112718), Corps of Royal Engineers.
- No. S/106393 Warrant Officer Class I Edward Herrick Stanley Wallace, Royal Army Service Corps.
- Lieutenant-Colonel (temporary) Patrick Joseph Walshe (117010), The Royal Inniskilling Fusiliers.
- No. 7586061 Warrant Officer Class II Reginald Stephen Charles Walters, Royal Electrical and Mechanical Engineers.
- Major (temporary) Frederick Selby Walthew (24238), Royal Army Pay Corps.
- Major (temporary) Pascoe Leigh Ward (21766), The Devonshire Regiment.
- Major Frank Warhurst (94892), Royal Corps of Signals.
- Major (acting) Willie Warick (94111), Pioneer Corps.
- Major (temporary) Herbert Leslie Warner (171886), Intelligence Corps.
- Major (temporary) Edward Frank Wark (191224), Royal Army Service Corps.
- Captain (temporary) John Lewis Warren (E.G.4601), 6th Rajputana Rifles, Indian Army.
- Major (temporary) Cecil Duncan Warwick (127974), Corps of Royal Engineers.
- No. S/73398 Warrant Officer Class II David James Watkins, Royal Army Service Corps.
- Major (temporary) John Paterson Watt (77410), Royal Corps of Signals.
- Major (temporary) Percy Arthur Watts (141574), The Buffs (Royal East Kent Regiment).
- Junior Commahder (temporary) Violet Evelyn Wellesley (196395), Auxiliary Territorial Service.
- Junior Commander (temporary) Ethel Grace Keys-Wells (196457), Auxiliary Territorial Service.
- Captain (temporary) Douglas Herbert West (194772), Royal Army Service Corps.
- Major (temporary) John Lewis West (106264), Royal Regiment of Artillery.
- Major (temporary) Harold Arthur Armstrong While (73894), Royal Regiment of Artillery.
- Captain (temporary) Neville White (E.G. 600), 10th Hyderabad Regiment, Indian Army.
- Captain (Quartermaster) Alfred Christopher Francis Wicks (70948), The Queen's Own Cameron Highlanders.
- Major (temporary) John Gelson Willetts (128824), Royal Army Service, Corps.
- The Reverend Harry Craven Williams, BA, (95737), Chaplain to the Forces, Third Class (acting), Royal Army Chaplains' Department.
- Lieutenant-Colonel (temporary) Joseph Thomas Williams, DCM, (O.S.32), Indian Army Ordnance Corps.
- Major (temporary) Percy James Williams (7712), The Welch Regiment.
- Major (temporary) Henry Martin Williamson (159769), The Cyprus Regiment.
- Junior Commander (temporary) Mary Williamson (216946), Auxiliary Territorial Service.
- Major (temporary) David Alastair Hamilton Wills (73993), The Queen's Own Cameron Highlanders.
- No. S/74921 Warrant Officer Class I Eustace Henry Wilson, Royal Army Service Corps.
- Major Robert Wilson, TD, (22827), Royal Regiment of Artillery.
- Major (temporary) Frederick Wolf (105937), Royal Regiment of Artillery.
- Captain (temporary) David Knoyle Wood (132773), Royal Regiment of Artillery.
- Junior Commander (temporary) Jean Woodside (238897), Auxiliary Territorial Service.
- Major (temporary) Roland Ernest Woodward (206744), The King's Regiment (Liverpool).
- Captain Vivian Dudley Perot Woolford, Captain in Command of the Home Guard in New Amsterdam.
- Major (temporary) John Maxwell Woolley (78926), Royal Regiment of Artillery.
- Captain (temporary) Major Denis Woolley (164644), The Northamptonshire Regiment.
- Junior Commander (temporary) Sheila Wortley (211443), Auxiliary Territorial Service.
- No. 4187014 Warrant Officer Class II Samuel Wright, Intelligence Corps.
- Junior Commander (temporary) Kathleen Mary Cornyns Wrigley (196943), Auxiliary Territorial Service.
- Junior Commander (temporary) Mary Wroe (294335), Auxiliary Territorial Service.
- Major (temporary) Philip Francis Yeatman (143556), Royal Corps of Signals.
- Major (temporary) John Leslie Yeomans (50490), General List, Infantry.
- Major (temporary) Alan Philip Young, 6th Rajputana Rifles, Indian Army.
- No. 3704416 Warrant Officer Class I Benjamin Young, The King's Own Royal Regiment (Lancaster).
- Major (temporary) William Hoare Hatchell Young, MC, (E.G. 1654), 13th Frontier Force Rifles, Indian Army.

==== Royal Air Force ====
- Wing Commander Peter Graeme Agnew (72531), RAFVR.
- Wing Commander Henry Victor Alexander (79452), RAFVR.
- Wing Commander William Monro Andrew (77975). RAFVR.
- Wing Commander Ian Home Bowhill (77818), RAFVR.
- Wing Commander Freke Williams Wiseman-Clarke (18129).
- Wing Commander Charles Edward John Dingle (90308), AAF.
- Wing Commander Claude Henry Duveen (77195), RAFVR.
- Wing Commander Dudley Fredric Hackett (72338), RAFVR.
- Wing Commander Cyril Hugh Lewis (70397), RAFVR.
- Wing Commander Geoffrey Howard William Selby-Lowndes, AFC, (18015).
- Wing Commander Thomas Victor Nelson (35209).
- Wing Commander Herbert Martin Parsons (72912), RAFVR.
- Wing Commander Victor Albert Peers (73581), RAFVR.
- Wing Commander George Arthur Richmond (34203).
- Wing Commander Edward Hatchings Roberts (76494), RAFVR.
- Wing Commander Anthony George Carl Somerhough (24075).
- Wing Commander Frederick Arthur Agar Hawker Agar-Strath (29217).
- Wing Commander Wilfred Charles Vaughan (73444), RAFVR.
- Wing Commander James Murray Wells (74889), RAFVR.
- Wing Commander Harold Harry Matthew Shurlock (36021).
- Lieutenant-Colonel Richard Mounteney Hilary (52301), SAAF.
- Acting Wing Commander Wilfred Stanley Brundish (82908), RAFVR.
- Acting Wing Commander Ernest Chambers (132210), RAFO.
- Acting Wing Commander George Geoffrey Cole (44467).
- Acting Wing Commander Alan Whalley Cunliffe (83530), RAFVR.
- Acting Wing Commander George William Patrick Dawes, DSO, AFC. (86472), RAFVR.
- Acting Wing Commander Alexander Hugh Hamon Massy Dickie (82327), RAFVR.
- Acting Wing Commander John Benton Fell (85110), RAFVR.
- Acting Wing Commander George Foggon (137799), RAFVR.
- Acting Wing Commander Frederick Garrod (43234).
- Acting Wing Commander Sidney Hulme (80876), RAFVR.
- Acting Wing Commander Nevil Kiddier (44690).
- Acting Wing Commander Sydney Russell Leitch (68390), RAFVR.
- Acting Wing Commander Sydney Hubert Lewis (108306), RAFVR.
- Acting Wing Commander Douglas Wykeham Lydall (28091), RAFO.
- Acting Wing Commander William Neal MacLay, MRCS, LRCP, (107803), RAFVR.
- Acting Wing Commander George Pevitt Russell (46097).
- Acting Wing Commander William Arnold Sime (78361), RAFVR.
- Acting Wing Commander Leonard Francis Smith (101720), RAFVR.
- Acting Wing Commander David Stevenson, MD, ChB, (77900), RAFVR.
- Acting Wing Commander Harry Aubrey Fletcher Summers (62447), RAFVR.
- Acting Wing Commander Norman Bennet Thomson (90935), AAF.
- Acting Wing Commander Frederick Wall (35135).
- Acting Wing Commander Walter George Woolliams (22095), RAFVR.
- Squadron Leader Clarence Eugene Armand (78346), RAFVR.
- Squadron Leader Robert Phillip Bales (Can/C.9887), RCAF.
- Squadron Leader Arthur Francis Bell (86928), RAFVR.
- Squadron Leader Albert Jess Bond (Can/C.8672), RCAF.
- Squadron Leader Alured Drew Bovill (87847), RAFVR.
- Squadron Leader John Arthur William Brooker (82072), RAFVR.
- Squadron Leader Albert Frederick Henry Brown (68919), RAFVR.
- Squadron Leader George Cameron Brown (Can/C.9889), RCAF.
- Squadron Leader William Donald Browne (44088).
- Squadron Leader Henry James Casey, MC, (79507), RAFVR.
- Squadron Leader Herbert Alfred Clarke (100668), RAFVR.
- Squadron Leader Raymund Gore-Clough (89721), RAFVR.
- Squadron Leader George Boyle Hanna Currie (84578), RAFVR.
- Squadron Leader Alexander Rose Dawson (Can/C.9831), RCAF.
- Squadron Leader Joseph Bryce Dickey (Can/C.8257), RCAF.
- Squadron Leader Victor Howard Ekins, DFC, (63073), RAFVR.
- Squadron Leader John Arnold Fox (84208), RAFVR.
- Squadron Leader Edgar Osbert Gifford (85169), RAFVR.
- Squadron Leader Stephen Ranulph Kingdom Glanville (76356), RAFVR.
- Squadron Leader Surendra Nath Goyal (Ind.1560), Royal Indian Air Force.
- Squadron Leader John Grimonond Gunn (68207), RAFVR.
- Squadron Leader John Arthur Edward Harrisson (85387), RAFVR.
- Squadron Leader Robert Randolph Brereton Hoodspith (Can/C.1595), RCAF.
- Squadron Leader John Frederick Houchin (72679), RAFVR.
- Squadron Leader James Howard (142594), RAFVR.
- Squadron Leader Maurice Georges Janin (Can/C.1918), RCAF.
- Squadron Leader Frank Postlethwaite Joyce (40303), RAFO.
- Squadron Leader Edward Bromilow Joynson (84209), RAFVR.
- Squadron Leader George Douglas Fletcher Keddie (76986), RAFVR.
- Squadron Leader William King (14225).
- Squadron Leader Barrie James Knight (Can/C.7711), RCAF.
- Squadron Leader Kenneth Arthur Waring Law (91045), AAF.
- Squadron Leader Tom Linnell (83076), RAFVR.
- Squadron Leader James Gordon Mann Loomis (Can/C.8264), Royal Canadian Air Force.
- Squadron Leader Malcolm Dalton Loucks (Can/C.8588), RCAF.
- Squadron Leader Gordon Alan McGowan (100142), RAFVR.
- Squadron Leader Thomas Daniel McKee (Can/C.5190), Royal Canadian Air Force.
- Squadron Leader George Robert Mack (70427), RAFVR.
- Squadron Leader Reginald Stanhope Martin (09189), RAFVR.
- Squadron Leader William Brown Murray, Southern Rhodesian Air Force.
- Squadron Leader David John Neville (Can/C.9010), RCAF.
- Squadron Leader Edward Sealey Nicholson (78648), RAFVR.
- Squadron Leader Leslie Frank Payne (70525), RAFO.
- Squadron Leader Ervin Plimley, Southern Rhodesian Air Force.
- Squadron Leader Michael Curtis Rawlence (78107), RAFVR.
- Squadron Leader Lawrence Cecil Belsham-Revell (23178).
- Squadron Leader Edmund Whiting Roythorne (83181), RAFVR.
- Squadron Leader Edward Salkeld Sharp (62466), RAFVR.
- Squadron Leader Ernest William Smith (60837), RAFVR.
- Squadron Leader Thomas Frederick Steele (70645), RAFO.
- Squadron Leader John Harcourt Limley Trustram (82359), RAFVR.
- Squadron Leader Francis Lewis Wills (75036), RAFVR.
- Squadron Leader Nonman Henry Wooding (60424), RAFVR.
- Squadron Leader Percy Malcolm Wright (81539), RAFVR.
- Acting Squadron Leader John Craig Allan (75920), RAFVR.
- Acting Squadron Leader Walter Samuel Allsopp (64746), RAFVR.
- Acting Squadron Leader William David Armstrong (111668), RAFVR.
- Acting Squadron Leader William Oliphant Baird (100486), RAFVR.
- Acting Squadron Leader Donald Holmes Bellamy (87276), RAFVR.
- Acting Squadron Leader Peter Billyeald, DFC, (77779), RAFVR.
- Acting Squadron Leader Charles Brook (108663), RAFVR.
- Acting Squadron Leader Gilbert Franklin Burns (61639), RAFVR.
- Acting Squadron Leader James Douglas Chittleburgh (67447), RAFVR.
- Acting Squadron Leader John Basil Collier (87232), RAFVR.
- Acting Squadron Leader Leonard Cook (77574), RAFVR.
- Acting Squadron Leader Arthur Henry Lucas Cooper (87766), RAFVR.
- Acting Squadron Leader Geoffrey Hampton Deeley (121491), RAFVR.
- Acting Squadron Leader Charles Herbert Dennis (83534), RAFVR.
- Acting Squadron Leader Cyril Henry Charles Down (48055).
- Acting Squadron Leader Evan Henry Enoch (100287), RAFVR.
- Acting Squadron Leader Harald George Evans (102227), RAFVR.
- Acting Squadron Leader Kenneth Dudley Foster (68473), RAFVR.
- Acting Squadron Leader Cecil John Fox (44277).
- Acting Squadron Leader William Ian Fraser (47730).
- Acting Squadron Leader Leslie Freeman (85142), RAFVR.
- Acting Squadron Leader Stanley Walter Fry (63501), RAFVR.
- Acting Squadron Leader George Alfred Gilbert (106380), RAFVR.
- Acting Squadron Leader Archibald William Giles (75130), RAFVR.
- Acting Squadron Leader Charles Derrick Gillin (85470), RAFVR.
- Acting Squadron Leader Sidney Norman Giroux (75364), RAFVR.
- Acting Squadron Leader Francis Harold Hall (114279), RAFVR.
- Acting Squadron Leader Francis John Hallinan (104979), RAFVR.
- Acting Squadron Leader Alan Sydney Hanna (68474), RAFVR.
- Acting Squadron Leader Harold Hercock (62499), RAFVR.
- Acting Squadron Leader Norman Edward Hext (46003).
- Acting Squadron Leader Peter Dalby Hodgson (113222), RAFVR.
- Acting Squadron Leader Arthur Leslie Holland, AFM, (42951).
- Acting Squadron Leader Lionel Rhodes Horrox (62429), RAFVR.
- Acting Squadron Leader Geoffrey Howard (44017).
- Acting Squadron Leader John Henshall Howell (117348), RAFVR.
- Acting Squadron Leader Henry Cecil Oliphant Jackson (64141), RAFVR.
- Acting Squadron Leader Kenneth Turner James (68074), RAFVR.
- Acting Squadron Leader Lewis Max Jenkins (45827).
- Acting Squadron Leader Harold Cecil Jepson (62503), RAFVR.
- Acting Squadron Leader Louis Arnold Justason (Can/C.8737), RCAF.
- Acting Squadron Leader William Kenworthy (86759), RAFVR.
- Acting Squadron Leader Eric William Kirby (43920).
- Acting Squadron Leader Herbert Morton Lampard (63540), RAFVR.
- Acting Squadron Leader George Frederick Lea (61187), RAFVR.
- Acting Squadron Leader John Arthur McCorquodale (54801).
- Acting Squadron Leader Peter Macario (45082).
- Acting Squadron Leader Peter Montagu Maggs (79376), RAFVR.
- Acting Squadron Leader Stewart Tom Mander (168546), RAFVR.
- Acting Squadron Leader Frank Mason, DFC, (115320), RAFVR.
- Acting Squadron Leader Charles Joseph Merryfull (Aus.424778), RAAF, with effect from 7 July 1945 (since deceased).
- Acting Squadron Leader Thomas William Hasson Mills (100144), RAFVR.
- Acting Squadron Leader Richard Ronald Mitchell, DFC, (45093).
- Acting Squadron Leader Sidney Frederick Mitchell (44089).
- Acting Squadron Leader Wilfred John Nave (79952), RAFVR.
- Acting Squadron Leader Wilfred Gumey Nelson (89234), RAFVR.
- Acting Squadron Leader Ernest William North (109256), RAFVR.
- Acting Squadron Leader James O'Donnell (43310).
- Acting Squadron Leader George Potts Owen (46933).
- Acting Squadron Leader Hubert Barren Pepper (138272), RAFVR.
- Acting Squadron Leader Bernard Stanley John Piff (46814).
- Acting Squadron Leader Emrys Owain Roberts, MP, (103115), RAFVR.
- Acting Squadron Leader Frederick Charles Rodwell (111012), RAFVR.
- Acting Squadron Leader Joseph Rogers (102161), RAFVR.
- Acting Squadron Leader John Douglas Rothery (146649), RAFVR.
- Acting Squadron Leader George William Scales (79987), RAFVR.
- Acting Squadron Leader George Thomas Schofield (89976), RAFVR.
- Acting Squadron Leader James Sinclair (85586), RAFVR.
- Acting Squadron Leader Roderick Stuart Smith (Can/C.9615), RCAF.
- Acting Squadron Leader Ralph Staines (121069), RAFVR.
- Acting Squadron Leader John Scouler Steven (90977), AAF.
- Acting Squadron Leader Richard Carless Swayne (84822) RAFVR.
- Acting Squadron Leader Sydney Stuart Sylvester, MM, (100243), RAFVR.
- Acting Squadron Leader Duncan Philip Taylor (63493), RAFVR.
- Acting Squadron Leader John William Telfer (44692).
- Acting Squadron Leader Jack Thomas Terry (50622).
- Acting Squadron Leader David Samson Thaw (85334) RAFVR.
- Acting Squadron Leader Alfred Donald Phipos Thomas (83022), RAFVR.
- Acting Squadron Leader Sidney James Thompson (105606), RAFVR.
- Acting Squadron Leader Arthur Edward Tomblin, DFC, (114080), RAFVR.
- Acting Squadron Leader Edwin Harry Umbers (66173), RAFVR.
- Acting Squadron Leader Terence George Ward, LRCP, LRCS, LRFPS, LDS, (106462), RAFVR.
- Acting Squadron Leader Edward Flemmich Webb (107409), RAFVR.
- Acting Squadron Leader Francis Whatmough (45514).
- Acting Squadron Leader Richard Neville Wheeler (115991), RAFVR.
- Acting Squadron Leader Philip Raymond Whittington (123406), RAFVR.
- Acting Squadron Leader James Morris Williams (46325).
- Acting Squadron Leader Henry Charles Wilson (111178), RAFVR.
- Acting Squadron Leader Charles Harold Wood (89194), RAFVR.
- The Reverend Robert Reginald Clements (81872), RAFVR.
- The Reverend Ronald William Martin (118022), RAFVR.
- The Reverend John Knott Page (126482), RAFVR.
- The Reverend Leo Edward Sanders (120199), RAFVR.
- Flight Lieutenant John Stanley Allen (104780), RAFVR.
- Flight Lieutenant William Herbert Allen (102751), RAFVR.
- Flight Lieutenant William Leycester Antrobus (62733), RAFVR.
- Flight Lieutenant Ernest Hopwood Badcock, DFC, (84717), RAFVR.
- Flight Lieutenant Harold Baker, DFC, (45075).
- Flight Lieutenant Richard John Kenneth Baker (47865).
- Flight Lieutenant Frank Martin Ballard (78633), RAFVR.
- Flight Lieutenant Cecil Carl Bounds (143792), RAFVR.
- Flight Lieutenant Robert Ivan Broughton (Can/C.18477), RCAF.
- Flight Lieutenant Frederic Brown (46457).
- Flight Lieutenant Richard Stanley Buckle (61838), RAFVR.
- Flight Lieutenant Stanley George Burdick (86211), RAFVR.
- Flight Lieutenant Alexander Fyfe Burns (61939), RAFVR.
- Flight Lieutenant Bryan William Buswell (89985), RAFVR.
- Flight Lieutenant Benjamin Charles Butcher (51235).
- Flight Lieutenant Roland Upcher Carr, MRCS, LRCP, (104987), RAFVR.
- Flight Lieutenant Stanley Ernest Charman (60495), RAFVR.
- Flight Lieutenant Murdoch McKenzie Charteris (112063), RAFVR.
- Flight Lieutenant John Kenneth Cheatle (112064), RAFVR.
- Flight Lieutenant Thomas Ian Macfarlane Clulow (65694), RAFVR.
- Flight Lieutenant Henry Frederick Jarvis Coe (88273), RAFVR.
- Flight Lieutenant John Raymond Ashwell-Cooke (100112) RAFVR.
- Flight Lieutenant William Archibald Cormack (48585).
- Flight Lieutenant John Gaunt Coward (46592).
- Flight Lieutenant David Crichton, MB, ChB, (61873), RAFVR.
- Flight Lieutenant George Denwood (53945).
- Flight Lieutenant James Dewar, GM, (85257), RAFVR.
- Flight Lieutenant Martin Dougan (45707).
- Flight Lieutenant Clifford Sydney Dowling (48446).
- Flight Lieutenant Arnold Geoffrey Entwistle (104633), RAFVR.
- Flight Lieutenant Leslie Harry Fairbrother (110456), RAFVR.
- Flight Lieutenant Robert Clears Fordham (47439).
- Flight Lieutenant Gilbert Louis Fowler (89962), RAFVR.
- Flight Lieutenant Maxwell Harvey Frame (75041), RAFVR.
- Flight Lieutenant Leslie Walter Francis (66084), RAFVR.
- Flight Lieutenant Ernest James Fulleylove (110877), RAFVR.
- Flight Lieutenant Francis Alex Bernard Gaire (47192).
- Flight Lieutenant Reuben Gale (121481), RAFVR.
- Flight Lieutenant John Maxwell Gilchrist (119731), RAFVR.
- Flight Lieutenant Geoffrey Goodman, DFC, (45491).
- Flight Lieutenant Edmund Victor Claud Grandhaie (63937), RAFVR.
- Flight Lieutenant William Henry Leslie Grant, AFM, (51515).
- Flight Lieutenant Kenneth Gordon Gray (120115), RAFVR.
- Flight Lieutenant Kenneth Greene, DFM, (149479), RAFVR.
- Flight Lieutenant Cyril Arthur Groves (45142).
- Flight Lieutenant Peter Raymond Hairs (76316), RAFVR.
- Flight Lieutenant Richmond Francis Lionel Hanna (Can/C.13666), RCAF.
- Flight Lieutenant Robert Haig Hansen (42603).
- Flight Lieutenant Norman Stanley Harrild (109122), RAFVR.
- Flight Lieutenant George Granville Harrisson (67130), RAFVR.
- Flight Lieutenant Kennell Michael Hay (110806), RAFVR.
- Flight Lieutenant Harold Blair Heeney (Can/J.11489), RCAF.
- Flight Lieutenant George Alexander Herlihy (45833).
- Flight Lieutenant Gordon James Russell Hickmott (114002), RAFVR.
- Flight Lieutenant Harry Hobson (48091).
- Flight Lieutenant Sidney Hoyes (89963), RAFVR.
- Flight Lieutenant James Hudson (133242), RAFVR.
- Flight Lieutenant Leonard Lewis Hunt, DFC, (117349), RAFVR.
- Flight Lieutenant Theodore Jenkins (121915), RAFVR.
- Flight Lieutenant Albert Edward Johnson (50597).
- Flight Lieutenant Frederick William Juee (140067), RAFVR.
- Flight Lieutenant Hubert Leslie Karby (111746), RAFVR.
- Flight Lieutenant Myer Julian Isador Kemper (62725), RAFVR.
- Flight Lieutenant David Cunningham Kerr (Can/C.29449), RCAF.
- Flight Lieutenant Harold Robert Kerr (136728), RAFVR.
- Flight Lieutenant George Kidd, AFM, (134591), RAFVR.
- Flight Lieutenant John Vincent Lack (57304), RAFVR.
- Flight Lieutenant William Edward Ladd (82250), RAFVR.
- Flight Lieutenant Alexander Finlayson Lang (129762), RAFVR.
- Flight Lieutenant Benjamin Roy Lewarne (135978), RAFVR.
- Flight Lieutenant Herbert Bernard Lewin (112651), RAFVR.
- Flight Lieutenant Albert Leslie Lowery (47964).
- Flight Lieutenant Geoffrey Frederick Lucas (112626), RAFVR.
- Flight Lieutenant John Foster Luck (141632), RAFVR.
- Flight Lieutenant Frank Henry Ludford (62391), RAFVR.
- Flight Lieutenant Ronald James MacCallum (46673).
- Flight Lieutenant Robert Wyatt McDowell, MB, BCh, (106498), RAFVR.
- Flight Lieutenant John Sutherland Macfarlane (112355), RAFVR.
- Flight Lieutenant James Kerr MacLachlan (48722).
- Flight Lieutenant Kenneth Godfrey MacMillan (73285), RAFVR.
- Flight Lieutenant Hamish Campbell MacNeill (Can/J.11627), RCAF.
- Flight Lieutenant William Marshall (141749), RAFVR.
- Flight Lieutenant Francis Arthur Minton (Can/C.7713), RCAF.
- Flight Lieutenant Geoffrey Duncan Mitchell (123850), RAFVR.
- Flight Lieutenant Stuart Andrew Moore (Can/C.13575), RCAF.
- Flight Lieutenant Stephen Sidney Moore (89690), RAFVR.
- Flight Lieutenant Charles Anstey Narbeth (76071), RAFVR.
- Flight Lieutenant Arthur Henry New (45929).
- Flight Lieutenant Norman Ernest Page (130043), RAFVR.
- Flight Lieutenant Lewis John Perkins (46373).
- Flight Lieutenant Francis Ingham Petticrew (45669).
- Flight Lieutenant Owen Geoffrey Langford Pillivante Powell (83941), RAFVR.
- Flight Lieutenant Antony Cyril Powner (62013), RAFVR.
- Flight Lieutenant Herman Brooke Prior (88066), RAFVR.
- Flight Lieutenant Claude Alfred Richardson (134521), RAFVR.
- Flight Lieutenant Leonard George Raymond (140892), RAFVR.
- Flight Lieutenant Dennis Nelson Relf (125569), RAFVR.
- Flight Lieutenant Kenneth Richards (63040), RAFVR.
- Flight Lieutenant Renwick Giles Dryden Riddell (146520), RAFVR.
- Flight Lieutenant William Gallaher Robinson (49070).
- Flight Lieutenant Ronald Samson Ross (104821), RAFVR.
- Flight Lieutenant Ambrose William Ryan, DSO, (84101).
- Flight Lieutenant Joseph Eusebe Real St. Amour (Can/C.13682), RCAF.
- Flight Lieutenant Donald Stanley Scales (87206), RAFVR.
- Flight Lieutenant William Edward Scott (101828), RAFVR.
- Flight Lieutenant Clarence Reginald Sluming, MB, ChB, DRCOG, (104200), RAFVR.
- Flight Lieutenant Robert Miller Sommerville (Aus.422735), RAAF.
- Flight Lieutenant David Bradshaw Stewart (Can/C.13907), RCAF.
- Flight Lieutenant Albert George Stone (148493), RAFVR.
- Flight Lieutenant McLean Strathern, MM, (88296), RAFVR.
- Flight Lieutenant Peter James Temple (139575), RAFVR.
- Flight Lieutenant Kenneth Ivor Thomas (51216).
- Flight Lieutenant Arthur Basil Tingey (78628), RAFVR.
- Flight Lieutenant Albert Tolfrey (47260).
- Flight Lieutenant George Thomas Townsend (78629), RAFVR.
- Flight Lieutenant Stanley Douglas Way, (45976).
- Flight Lieutenant Harvey Mowat Webb (Can/C.24852), RCAF.
- Flight Lieutenant Gordon Newton Wells (103346), RAFVR.
- Flight Lieutenant Herbert Walton Wilkinson (114648), RAFVR.
- Flight Lieutenant Ronald Banford Williamson (82439), RAFVR.
- Flight Lieutenant Clifford George Witchell (102517), RAFVR.
- Flight Lieutenant Arthur William Wootton (45777).
- Flight Lieutenant Walter Thomas Young (82900), RAFVR.
- Captain James Elwyn Davies (202927V), SAAF.
- Captain Hugh Cowan Drummond (52460V), SAAF.
- Captain Pertrus Daniel Du Toit (59296V), SAAF.
- Captain Frederick Rex Glaze-Rivers (99908V), SAAF.
- Captain William Sugden McEwan (130670V), SAAF.
- Captain William Leighton Milne (983927), SAAF.
- Captain Leonard Francis Morrison (003720V), SAAF.
- Captain William Robert Campbell Muir (177738V), SAAF.
- Captain Eric Spangenberg (3125937), SAAF.
- The Reverend Oliver Roebuck, Southern Rhodesian Air Force.
- Acting Flight Lieutenant Ernest Alfred Bailey (144407), RAFVR.
- Acting Flight Lieutenant Edward Huia Banks (115088), RAFVR.
- Acting Flight Lieutenant George Charles Barnes (114144), RAFVR.
- Acting Flight Lieutenant Norman Barratt (100214), RAFVR.
- Acting Flight Lieutenant Henry Gifford Barwood (64094), RAFVR.
- Acting Flight Lieutenant Adalbert Kenneth Bellows (100721).
- Acting Flight Lieutenant Ernest Norman Beswick (47924).
- Acting Flight Lieutenant Haddon Carey Bird (110424), RAFVR.
- Acting Flight Lieutenant Herbert George Boreham (101646), RAFVR.
- Acting Flight Lieutenant David Peter Brachi (102326), RAFVR.
- Acting Flight Lieutenant Edward Walter Brown (119174), RAFVR.
- Acting Flight Lieutenant Herbert Frederick John Callan (118991), RAFVR.
- Acting Flight Lieutenant Harry Cartwright (129095), RAFVR.
- Acting Flight Lieutenant Richard John Chamberlin (114174), RAFVR.
- Acting Flight Lieutenant William Edmund Chapman (49080).
- Acting Flight Lieutenant Harold Chartres (144995), RAFVR.
- Acting Flight Lieutenant Charles Whittington Chesney (48249).
- Acting Flight Lieutenant Horace Frank Clarke (109415), RAFVR.
- Acting Flight Lieutenant Arthur Leslie Colbeck (121617), RAFVR.
- Acting Flight Lieutenant John Iream Coleman (109417), RAFVR.
- Acting Flight Lieutenant Sydney Charles William Collier (50863).
- Acting Flight Lieutenant Charles Graham Coomer (117171), RAFVR.
- Acting Flight Lieutenant Rhys Jones Cornelius (53526).
- Acting Flight Lieutenant William George Dalrymple (132058), RAFVR.
- Acting Flight Lieutenant Thomas Lloyd Davies (48123).
- Acting Flight Lieutenant Wilfred Llewellyn Davies (157246), RAFVR.
- Acting Flight Lieutenant Ernest James Detheridge (156887), RAFVR.
- Acting Flight Lieutenant Arthur Durling (146812), RAFVR.
- Acting Flight Lieutenant Thomas William Elsmore (50571).
- Acting Flight Lieutenant Harold Esslemont (110451), RAFVR.
- Acting Flight Lieutenant Arthur Frank Evans (113975), RAFVR.
- Acting Flight Lieutenant Frank William Fisher (46625).
- Acting Flight Lieutenant Reginald John Franklin (48761).
- Acting Flight Lieutenant Hubert Gregory Gardiner (50084).
- Acting Flight Lieutenant James Ernest Garrick (138252), RAFVR.
- Acting Flight Lieutenant John Hedley Garside (142596), RAFVR.
- Acting Flight Lieutenant Leslie Ernest Gatrell (693636) RAFVR.
- Acting Flight Lieutenant Harry Brereton Haivepson (104731), RAFVR.
- Acting Flight Lieutenant Joseph Fletcher Harriman (88280), RAFVR.
- Acting Flight Lieutenant John Leslie Hawley (109629), RAFVR.
- Acting Flight Lieutenant Thomas Henry Hignett (50065).
- Acting Flight Lieutenant John Boagey Hoare (141179), RAFVR.
- Acting Flight Lieutenant Leslie John Hogben (109561), RAFVR.
- Acting Flight Lieutenant Leonard George Hope (121778), RAFVR.
- Acting Flight Lieutenant Harold Lupton Howard (148345), RAFVR.
- Acting Flight Lieutenant Edwin Walter Ingram (109227), RAFVR.
- Acting Flight Lieutenant Ernest Alfred Ingroville (50392), RAFVR.
- Acting Flight Lieutenant Vernon Leslie Jones (110519), RAFVR.
- Acting Flight Lieutenant Geoffrey Jury (112779), RAFVR.
- Acting Flight Lieutenant Charles Kemp (49043).
- Acting Flight Lieutenant Ronald Charles Lambert (50875).
- Acting Flight Lieutenant David Livingstone (47612).
- Acting Flight Lieutenant James Robert Maurice Longstaff (48024).
- Acting Flight Lieutenant Richard Los (47915).
- Acting Flight Lieutenant Reginald George James Lynch (51245).
- Acting Flight Lieutenant John Alexander Munro Macbean (53049).
- Acting Flight Lieutenant Robert Samuel McCartney (Can/C.12792), RCAF.
- Acting Flight Lieutenant John Martin Manning (132103), RAFVR.
- Acting Flight Lieutenant Thomas Jeffe Mathews (137512), RAFVR.
- Acting Flight Lieutenant Satya Pal Mehta (Ind.2067) Royal Indian Air Force.
- Acting Flight Lieutenant William John Merrick (109011), RAFVR.
- Acting Flight Lieutenant John Braynard Moore (168539), RAFVR.
- Acting Flight Lieutenant Desmond Henry Clements Nixon (48382).
- Acting Flight Lieutenant John O'Hara (48295).
- Acting Flight Lieutenant Noel Osborne (139079), RAFVR.
- Acting Flight Lieutenant Rodney Graham Page (112526), RAFVR.
- Acting Flight Lieutenant Gordon Richard Panchuk (Can/C.18825), RCAF.
- Acting Flight Lieutenant Archibald Frank Pape (113582), RAFVR.
- Acting Flight Lieutenant James Pearson (141505), RAFVR.
- Acting Flight Lieutenant John Mayne Phillips (53121).
- Acting Flight Lieutenant Hendrih Adriaan Pistorious, Southern Rhodesian Air Force.
- Acting Flight Lieutenant Herbert Pulitzer (69602), RAFVR.
- Acting Flight Lieutenant Arthur Philip Rayner (137801), RAFVR.
- Acting Flight Lieutenant Cecil William Alfred Reeve (110023), RAFVR.
- Acting Flight Lieutenant William Frederick Reeves (106894), RAFVR.
- Acting Flight Lieutenant Fred Ridgeway (147241), RAFVR.
- Acting Flight Lieutenant Charle John Robbins (68840), RAFVR.
- Acting Flight Lieutenant Henry Rudolf Rocky (139236), RAFVR.
- Acting Flight Lieutenant Wyndham George Rogers (50121).
- Acting Flight Lieutenant Ivor Rudd (51398).
- Acting Flight Lieutenant Reginald Charles Rulf (157031), RAFVR.
- Acting Flight Lieutenant Frederick William Sander (107634), RAFVR.
- Acting Flight Lieutenant Eric Sankey (47060).
- Acting Flight Lieutenant Norman Scott (110531), RAFVR.
- Acting Flight Lieutenant David Louis Speeks (134172), RAFVR.
- Acting Flight Lieutenant David Frame-Stark (109009), RAFVR
- Acting Flight Lieutenant Brian Leetham Peart Terry (64977), RAFVR.
- Acting Flight Lieutenant Herbert Neville Thomas (105604), RAFVR.
- Acting Flight Lieutenant Frederick Antoine Van Meeteren (112823), RAFVR.
- Acting Flight Lieutenant John James Walker (101731), RAFVR.
- Acting Flight Lieutenant Robert Whalley (50822).
- Acting Flight Lieutenant John Campbell Thomson Wilkie (51413).
- Acting Flight Lieutenant Humphrey Humphreys Williams (105640), RAFVR.
- Acting Flight Lieutenant Jack Derek Woodington (123160), RAFVR.
- Acting Flight Lieutenant Ray Woolf (101753), RAFVR.
- Acting Flight Lieutenant Kenneth John David Young (50375).
- Acting Flight Lieutenant Norman Zacour (Can/C.85208), RCAF.
- Flying Officer Eric Russell Adams (63175), RAFVR.
- Flying Officer Henry Charles Fitzgerald Blake (158155), RAFVR.
- Flying Officer Richard William Boxall, MC, (85306), RAFVR.
- Flying Officer Frederick William Bradnock (130095), RAFVR.
- Flying Officer Russel Edgar Brill (121121), RAFVR.
- Flying Officer Leslie Casey (175447), RAFVR.
- Flying Officer William Harry Coombe-Channings (54367).
- Flying Officer Sidney George Clements (52680).
- Flying Officer Raymond Leslie Croot (162747), RAFVR.
- Flying Officer Joseph Duckworth (50152).
- Flying Officer Donald Dunford (53066).
- Volunteer Flying Officer Leslie James Dyke (Aus.10192), RAAF.
- Flying Officer John Eric Edwards (172665), RAFVR.
- Flying Officer Edward William Stephen Ellis (170831), RAFVR.
- Flying Officer George Reginald Halling (52336).
- Flying Officer Cyril John Hector (N.Z.391354), RNZAF.
- Flying Officer Harry Ibbs (129656), RAFVR.
- Flying Officer Alfred Leslie Jones (53695).
- Flying Officer John Maldwyn Jones (113198), RAFVR.
- Flying Officer John Watkins Jones (51459).
- Flying Officer John Jefferies Lovegrove (116938), RAFVR.
- Flying Officer Robert John McAusland (53053).
- Flying Officer Robert Duncan MacMillan (51936).
- Flying Officer Ronald Horace Madgett (48202).
- Flying Officer Alan Harbury Mann (Aus.428334), RAAF.
- Flying Officer Stuart Edward Nicol (N.Z.416573) RNZAF.
- Flying Officer Johnathan Albert Parker (54067).
- Flying Officer Mathew Joseph Reilly (52413).
- Flying Officer Roland Edward Robinson (175606), RAFVR.
- Flying Officer Frederick James Selby (51249).
- Flying Officer Cecil James Shaw (Aus.1568), RAAF.
- Flying Officer John Arthur Stratfold (147148), RAFVR.
- Flying Officer Elmore Dudley Stuart (Aus.22579), RAAF.
- Flying Officer Harry Sweetman (135966), RAFVR.
- Flying Officer Geoffrey Hugh Templeman (121392), RAFVR.
- Flying Officer William Thomas Chadwick Towers (140293), RAFVR.
- Flying Officer Dennis Goodall Towler (170501), RAFVR.
- Flying Officer Clifford George Wing (54277).
- Flying Officer Ralph Barton Worthington (53746).
- Lieutenant N. David Broom (126337V), SAAF.
- Warrant Officer James Atkin (329077).
- Warrant Officer Reginald William Avery (363528).
- Warrant Officer Joseph Alfred Baker (362809).
- Warrant Officer David Thomas Barnes (365178).
- Warrant Officer Alfred Thomas Bayley (590633).
- Warrant Officer Gilbert Ernest Beesley (363836).
- Warrant Officer Albert Thomas Bellerby (514042).
- Warrant Officer Cyril Austin Bishop (331992).
- Warrant Officer William Edward Brown (340459).
- Warrant Officer John William Burrell (344537).
- Warrant Officer Cecil William Burrows (560536).
- Warrant Officer Robert George Calder (505436).
- Warrant Officer Colin Maurice Campbell (53095).
- Warrant Officer William James Sydney Carpenter (356278).
- Warrant Officer Edwin George Carr (365215).
- Warrant Officer Maurice Edgar William Clark (513073).
- Warrant Officer Ronald George Cocks (Aus.5093), RAAF.
- Warrant Officer David Corbett (351860).
- Warrant Officer Charles Arthur Cox (327026).
- Warrant Officer Cyril Gordon Cross (563080).
- Warrant Officer Herbert Elsom Crane (349381).
- Warrant Officer Andrew Charles Gill Davenport (326211).
- Warrant Officer Thomas Albert Stanley Davies (407592).
- Warrant Officer Robert William Ellis, DFM, (363389).
- Warrant Officer Sidney James Fenton (406068).
- Warrant Officer Albert Franklin (166114).
- Warrant Officer Albert Edward Garnett (363605).
- Warrant Officer Albert Victor Halladey (350620).
- Warrant Officer Walter Burton Harker (528368).
- Warrant Officer William Holiday Harris (244309).
- Warrant Officer Albert Henry Hart (361986).
- Warrant Officer Arthur Edwin Hill (222077).
- Warrant Officer John Richard Holmes (541340).
- Warrant Officer Harold John Innocent (560170).
- Warrant Officer Percy William Johnson (363012).
- Warrant Officer George William Joseph Jones (343661).
- Warrant Officer Wallace Henry Keast (351574).
- Warrant Officer Francis Arthur Kelly (354902).
- Warrant Officer Cyril Edward Little (334441).
- Warrant Officer Walter William Mabe (Aus.6161), RAAF.
- Warrant Officer Harry Marriott (508395).
- Warrant Officer Charles Mason (350184).
- Warrant Officer Arthur John May (511110).
- Warrant Officer Robert Anthony Melhuish (1199703), RAFVR.
- Warrant Officer Edward Arthur Millen (365899).
- Warrant Officer James William Morgan (346325).
- Warrant Officer James Morton (590609).
- Warrant Officer John O'Reilly (590363).
- Warrant Officer Charles Edward Painter (Can/C.1980), RCAF.
- Warrant Officer Lewis Vernon Peel (910045), RAFVR.
- Warrant Officer Sidney Richard Pegg (910).
- Warrant Officer Leslie William Moms Perkins (511178).
- Warrant Officer Arthur Reginald Pitman (15125).
- Warrant Officer Charles Henry Pusey (515871).
- Warrant Officer George Read (513686).
- Warrant Officer Edward Henry Robbins (215630).
- Warrant Officer Robert Goodman Roberts (350210).
- Warrant Officer William Henry Rowlett (530695).
- Warrant Officer William Middleton Cameron Shepherd (158400).
- Warrant Officer Alfred Charles George Short (364292).
- Warrant Officer Philip Michael Slade (530635).
- Warrant Officer Stanley George Smith (561371).
- Warrant Officer Glanville William Snelling (P.4833V), SAAF.
- Warrant Officer Joseph Frederick Oliver Squires (910077), RAFVR.
- Warrant Officer Thomas Penistone Stringfellow (356126).
- Warrant Officer Wilfred Alfred Tinker (353513).
- Warrant Officer Frederick George Topping (800553), RAFVR.
- Warrant Officer Cecil Wallace Wickerson (354266).
- Warrant Officer Holcombe Wilkinson (524683).
- Warrant Officer Donald Richard Williams (364339).
- Warrant Officer Trefor Williams (590922).
- Warrant Officer George Henry Yeg (590368).
- Warrant Officer Maurice Wilfred Young (361755).
- Acting Warrant Officer James Edward Blacksell (1198684), RAFVR.
- Acting Warrant Officer Herbert Avey Brock (357100).
- Acting Warrant Officer John Farthing (562114), RAFVR.
- Acting Warrant Officer Ernest James Ferris (517851).
- Acting Warrant Officer Edward Davidson Hills (359365).
- Acting Warrant Officer Thomas James (867914), RAFVR.
- Acting Warrant Officer George Willis Lennard (536606).
- Acting Warrant Officer Clarence Campbell Sydney Pralle (1207803), RAFVR.
- Warrant Officer 2nd Class Edward Bechard (10241), RCAF.
- Warrant Officer 2nd Class John Carlyon Brink (75529V), SAAF.
- Warrant Officer 2nd Class George Edward James (96840V), SAAF.
- Warrant Officer 2nd Class Eric Colin MacGillivray (253655V), SAAF.
- Warrant Officer 2nd Class Charles Stuart Pittendrick (187672V), SAAF.
- Rab Tremma Odisho Natan.
- Acting Wing Officer Mary Agnes Cumella (1891), WAAF.
- Squadron Officer Helen Augusta Buik (V.30111), RCAF (Women's Division).
- Squadron Officer Kathleen Margaret Collins (378), WAAF.
- Squadron Officer Annie McWilliam McCurrach (1493), WAAF.
- Squadron Officer Anne Stephens (86), WAAF.
- Squadron Officer Winifred Virtue (3679), WAAF.
- Acting Squadron Officer Marguerita Ellis Bourhill (4347), WAAF.
- Flight Officer Mary Tait Thomson Aytoun (1440), WAAF.
- Flight Officer Helen Bayne, Southern Rhodesian Women's Auxiliary Air Service.
- Flight Officer Emily Doreen Coulthard (1616), WAAF.
- Flight Officer Josephine Anita Madeline Dodge (2762), WAAF.
- Flight Officer Kathleen Lucy Downs (1351), WAAF.
- Flight Officer Edith Isabella MacGowan (1552), WAAF.
- Flight Officer Mary Isolda MacKenzie (946), WAAF.
- Flight Officer Ethel Margaret Pasley (2682), WAAF.
- Flight Officer Eleanor Francis Miller Sumner (431), WAAF.
- Flight Officer Catherine Mary Warner (1759), WAAF.
- Flight Officer lone Seaton Winton (1594), WAAF.???
- Captain Alma Williams (F.46503V), South African WAAF.
- Acting Flight Officer Marjorie Emma Boulton (5175), WAAF.
- Acting Flight Officer Nancy David (3575), WAAF.
- Acting Flight Officer Carol Durrant (1395), WAAF.
- Acting Flight Officer Gabrielle Mary Feeny (5434), WAAF.
- Acting Flight Officer Constance Lilian Gallavan (2730), WAAF.
- Acting Flight Officer Vera Ada Graham (5178), WAAF.
- Acting Flight Officer Constance Alice Hand (2550), WAAF.
- Acting Flight Officer Isabel McCrae Mutch (V.30411), RCAF (Women's Division).
- Acting Flight Officer Stella Muriel Packham (2926), WAAF.
- Acting Flight Officer Dulcie Jessie Neale Percy (2781), WAAF.
- Acting Flight Officer Margaret Louise Rowley (5444), WAAF.
- Acting Flight Officer Eunice Lily Saltes (3290), WAAF.
- Section Officer Joan Betty Bayley (5378), WAAF.
- Section Officer Joyce May Brotherton (2911), WAAF.
- Section Officer Dorothy Anne Crawford (7565), WAAF.
- Section Officer Stephanie Jeanette Eddowes (1730), WAAF.
- Section Officer Eva Gertrude Farrow (3968), WAAF.
- Section Officer Flora Gillespie (6545), WAAF.
- Section Officer Barbara Clementina Hill (3682), WAAF.
- Section Officer Thelma Hamilton-Jones (6629), WAAF.
- Section Officer Betty Mary Hampson (7117), WAAF.
- Section Officer Doreen Sylvia Lambert (6160), WAAF.
- Section Officer Jean Evelyn Slingo (5812), WAAF.
- Warrant Officer Marie Louise Grantham (886919), WAAF.
- Warrant Officer Vera Eleanor Thomas (895562), WAAF.
- Warrant Officer Helena Tyson (886260), WAAF.

=== Civil Division ===
- William Abingdon, Staff Control Officer, Entertainments National Service Association.
- Charles Learmont Adam, Commandant, Dunbarton County Special Constabulary.
- Elizabeth Norman-Adams, British Red Cross Society Welfare Officer, Horton Emergency Medical Service Hospital, Epsom, Surrey.
- Jessie Andrina Violet Adamson, Accountant, Accountant-General's Department, General Post Office.
- Arthur Ainsworth, Works Manager, A. V. Roe Ltd., Woodford Aerodrome, Cheshire.
- Frederick Robert Aldhous, Assistant Director, Road Haulage Organisation, Ministry of War Transport.
- Owen Adolphus Alexander, Senior Technical Officer, Timber Control, Ministry of Supply.
- Colonel Mark Fryar Allan, Clerk, First Class, General Post Office.
- Charles Alfred Allen, Chief Accountant, Board of Customs and Excise.
- Harry Allen, Director, Lloyds Packing Warehouses Ltd.
- Albert Henry Edward Allingham, Senior Staff Officer, Admiralty.
- Ernest Thomas Allway, Examiner of Naval Ordnance Work, Admiralty.
- Major Robert David Ambrose, DCM, lately County Training Officer, Civil Defence Services, Norfolk.
- David Anderson, Chemical Engineer, Imperial Chemical Industries Ltd. (Alkali Division).
- Edith Maude Monroe Anderson, Honorary Secretary, County Antrim Branch, Soldiers', Sailors' and Airmen's Help Society.
- James Anderson, Skipper of the steam trawler W. H. Podd.
- Kezia Mary Stewart-Anderson, Commandant, Mechanised Transport Corps.
- George Frederick Andrassy, Engineer and Surveyor, Thurrock Urban District Council and lately Officer-in-Charge, Civil Defence Rescue and Decontamination Service.
- Charles Andrews, Manager, Switchgear Department, William McGeoch & Company Ltd.
- Elizabeth Anderson Andrews, Convener, Officers Hostels Sub-Committee, Church of Scotland.
- William Francis Andrews, Works Manager, Richard Garrett Engineering Works, Ltd.
- Thomas Benjamin Esdaile Angliss, FSI, Liaison and Welfare Officer, Isle of Man Internment Camps.
- Helena Irene Angood, Assistant, HM Treasury.
- Doris Sheila Hester Willoughby Archdale, representative in Canada of the Children's Overseas Reception Board.
- Harry Devoil Archer, Superintendent, Sussex County Police Force.
- Percival Ernest Archer, employed in a Department of the Foreign Office.
- Arthur Reginald Arlow, Works Manager (Hull, Engineering and Electrical), Milford United Engineering & Trading Company Ltd.
- Captain Guy Bowder Armstrong, County Commissioner, Lincolnshire, Joint War Organisation of the British Red Cross Society and Order of St. John.
- Walter Armstrong, AMInstCE, AMIMechE, Divisional Officer, No. 4 (Leeds) Fire Force, National Fire Service.
- James Thomas Ash, Works Manager, Clarke Aircraft Products Ltd.
- Squadron Leader Leslie Stuart Ash, AFRAeS, RAFVR, lately Chief Test Pilot and Assistant to Managing Director, Saunders Roe Ltd.
- Vera Muriel Ashley, Assistant, Ministry of Aircraft Production.
- William Richard Ashmeade, Works Manager, Whitehead Torpedo Works, Vickers-Armstrongs Ltd.
- Alfred Charles Ashton, Head, Patents Branch, British Air Commission, Ministry of Aircraft Production.
- Reginald Aslin, Works Manager & Production Manager, Rover Company Ltd.
- Frederick James Atkin, Local Army Welfare Officer, Spilsby, Lincolnshire.
- Kenneth Donald Atkins, Publicity Technical Officer, National Savings Committee.
- Arthur Stanley Atkinson, Manager, Belfast Branch of the State Assurance Company Ltd.
- Clara Eleanor Atkinson, Matron, Ochil Hills Sanatorium, Kinross.
- Henry Atkinson, Shop Superintendent, English Electrical Company Ltd.
- Hannah Breckon Auckland, Superintendent, Coventry Nursing Association.
- Alfred George Austin, MC, Staff Officer, Ministry of War Transport.
- Sidney Avery, Secretary and Treasurer, Forth Pilotage Authority.
- Fred Bailey, Clerk to the Repton Rural District Council and Chief Billeting Officer.
- John George Bailey, Works Manager and Director, A. A. Jones & Shipman Ltd.
- John Harvey Bailey, Works Manager, Negretti & Zambra Ltd.
- Thomas Lewis Bailey, Chief Billeting Officer, Stoke-on-Trent.
- Flight Captain James Bain, Superintendent, Flight Engineers, Air Transport Auxiliary.
- James Gladstone Bain, Executive Assistant, London Passenger Transport Board.
- Captain John Meldrum Bain, Master, SS Mount Battock, Dodds Steam Fishing Company Ltd.
- Charles William Baker, Assistant Finance Officer, Ministry of War Transport.
- Clarence Ward Baker, Manager, Ministry of Labour and National Service Employment Exchange, Chelmsford.
- Sydney Harold Baker, Executive Secretary, Stores and Supplies Committee, National Council of Young Men's Christian Associations for England, Wales and Ireland.
- Aileen Balcon, Chairman of Canteens Committee, Joint War Organisation of the British Red Cross Society and Order of St. John.
- Thomas Ballantyne, JP, Chairman, East Renfrewshire Local Savings Committee.
- Frederic Osmond Bamford, lately Secretary to Assistant Controller for Warship Production, Admiralty.
- John Banner, Experimental Officer, Naval Air Radio Department, Admiralty.
- Robert John Bannister, Staff Officer, Ministry of Aircraft Production.
- Andrew Lindsay Barclay, Assistant Controller of Supplies, Ministry of Works.
- Edwin Barker, MSc, Educational Secretary, National Council of Young Men's Christian Associations for England, Wales and Ireland.
- Stephen Barker, AMIMechE, Technical Director, R. A. Dyson & Company Ltd.
- Robert Barlow, Deputy Regional Controller, Board of Trade, recently employed ah the Ministry of Production.
- Frederick Barnard, Chief Officer, SS Empire Haig, Ellerman's Wilson Line Ltd.
- Gladys Violet Barnard, Honorary Secretary, Norwich Services Club.
- Frederick John Barnes, Deputy Food Executive Officer, Ministry of Food.
- James Barnes (Junior), GM, MINA, Joint Managing Director, Charles Howson & and Company Ltd.
- Oswald Tonkin Barnes, Second Engineer Officer, SS Tamaha, Socony-Vacuum Transportation Company Ltd.
- Ralph Barnes, Ex-Soldier Clerk, Grade "A", War Office.
- Sidney Barnes, Head Cashier, Holts Branch, Glyn Mills Bank.
- Winifred Alice Barnes, Staff Clerk, Ministry of Labour and National Service.
- George Emslie Barr, Chief Draughtsman, Engineer Department, William Denny & Brothers.
- Margaret Forsyth Barr, Higher Clerical Officer, Department of Health for Scotland.
- William Cowper Barrons, Honorary Secretary, Northampton and Northamptonshire Information Committee.
- Arthur Harold Edward Barrow, lately Regional Raid Spotting Officer, London Civil Defence Region.
- Councillor Christopher Fraser Barrow, lately Distribution Superintendent, Sunderland Gas Company.
- Clare Emily Barry, Senior Woman Officer, No. 4 (Eastern) Regional Fire Headquarters, National Fire Service.
- Mabel Dorothy Jackson-Barstow, Joint Centre Organiser, Weston-super-Mare, Women's Voluntary Services. For services to Civil Defence.
- Charles Barter, Spitfire Repairs Manager, Vickers-Armstrongs Ltd.
- James Richard Godfrey Barter, Petroleum Engineer, Asiatic Petroleum Company Ltd.
- Harold Louis Barthel, Assistant Administrative Officer, War Office.
- Richard Robert Oliver Barwick, Area Leader, Dover and Deal Works and Building Emergency Organisation.
- Frederick Charles Bassett, lately Principal Clerk, Royal Ordnance Factory, Hereford.
- George Victor Batchelor, Chief Superintendent of Workshops, Ordnance Survey.
- Alfred Harry Bateman, Director and Works Manager, Loders & Nucoline Ltd.
- Dorothy Maud Bates, JP, County Borough Organiser, Leicester, Women's Voluntary Services. For services to Civil Defence.
- Captain Charles Andre Bathfield, GM, MRCS, LRCP, Station Medical Officer, Air Transport Auxiliary.
- Frederick James Batson, Honorary Secretary, Bury St. Edmunds Savings Committee.
- Elsie Margaret Wann Batty, Assistant Regional Petroleum Officer, Ministry of Fuel and Power.
- John Herring Bayfield, Assistant Secretary (Supply) Cocoa and Chocolate and Sugar Confectionery War-Time Associations.
- Captain Ronald Victor Baylis, MC, lately County Air Raid Precautions Officer and Deputy County Controller, Oxfordshire.
- Captain John Bayly, Air Transport Auxiliary.
- Herbert Edward Beale, Chief Accountant, Middle East, Navy, Army and Air Force Institutes.
- Sarah Ashbourne Baker-Beall, JP. For public services in Bexley Heath.
- David Beatson, Chief Officer, Salvage Corps, Glasgow.
- Captain Robinson Beattie, Master, SS Redcar, Peninsular & Oriental Steam Navigation Company.
- Eileen Beatty, Health Visitor, Child Welfare Department, Edinburgh.
- William Anthony Beck, Staff Officer, His Majesty's Stationery Office.
- Alfred Howard Becke, MC, Secretary, John Readhead & Sons Ltd.
- Kathleen Mary Becke, Secretary, Canteen Committee, Young Women's Christian Association War Services.
- William Henry Beeston, lately Officer-in-Charge, Civil Defence Rescue Service, Stoke-on-Trent.
- Frederic Bell, Assistant Works Manager, Powell Duffryn Ltd.
- Geoffrey Oswald Bell, Senior Civilian Officer, Directorate of Mechanical Engineering, War Office.
- Sidney Bell, Chairman, Bournemouth Savings Committee.
- Clifford Charles Edward Bellringer, Scientific Officer, Telecommunications Research Establishment, Ministry of Aircraft Production.
- Mabel Dorothy Belton, Matron, Nelson Hospital, Merton, Surrey. For services to Civil Defence.
- Ada Bentley, Chairman, Street Groups Sub-Committee, Leek Savings Committee.
- William Bentley, AMIMechE, Joint Managing Director, Bentley Engineering Company Ltd.
- Reginald Barnett Benwell, Regional Manager, North Midland Region, Petroleum Board.
- Frank James Beresford, Lay Officer, Civil Defence Casualty Service, Bethnal Green.
- Kathleen Carlotta Douglas Patton-Bethune, Organiser, Union Jack Club, Casablanca.
- Doreen Marie Bett, employed in a Department of the Foreign Office.
- Leslie Billcliffe, Assistant Information Officer, India Office.
- George William Bird, Senior Production Officer, Radio Production Executive.
- Norman Noble Bird, Manager, Bridgewater Department, Manchester Ship Canal Company.
- Ernest John Henry Birt, Senior Pilot (First Class Master of Yard Craft), Admiralty.
- Marguerite Frances Martin Bishop, Chief Assistant, Leather Control, Ministry of Supply.
- Percy Bishop, Manager, Ministry of Labour and National Service Employment Exchange, Deptford and Greenwich.
- Reginald Simpson Bisset. For services to the Savings Campaigns in Aberdeen.
- Annie Blackwell, Probation Officer, Miskin Lower Petty Sessional Division, Glamorgan.
- Ernest George Blaiklock, Assistant Manager, Vickers Armstrongs Ltd.
- Robert James McFeeter Blair, Senior Staff Officer, Board of Inland Revenue, Belfast.
- Charles James Vernon Bland, Ex-Soldier Clerk, Grade "A", War Office.
- John Arthur Blellock, Ex-Soldier Clerk, Grade "A", War Office.
- Marguerite Pauline Mary Blount, County Director, Sussex Branch, British Red Cross Society.
- Frederick Boddy, Accountant, War Office.
- Alexander Grossman Bolam, FSI, lately District Air Raid Precautions Controller, Berwick-on-Tweed.
- Frederick Bollen, Staff Officer, Air Ministry.
- Jack Lingard Bond, lately Chief Warden and Assistant Air Raid Precautions Sub-Controller, Evesham.
- Henry Morgan Boniface, Chief Fishery Officer, Sussex Sea Fisheries Committee.
- Arthur Wilfred Bonsall, employed in a Department of the Foreign Office.
- Norman Reginald Boorman, Superintendent, British Thomson-Houston Company, Ltd., Newcastle-under-Lyme.
- John Spendlove Borrington, Factory Superintendent, British Thomson-Houston Company Ltd.
- Percival Alfred Bosanquet, Education Officer, Grade III, Air Ministry.
- Alfred James Boss, lately Naval Store Officer, Admiralty.
- Cecil Edward Bottle, Engineer-in-Charge, London, British Broadcasting Corporation.
- Reginald Comyn Boucher, Managing Director, F. C. Lowe & Son Ltd.
- Ernest Edwin Bowles, Works Manager, Air Pumps Ltd.
- Edward James Charles Bowmaker, Head Production Manager, James A. Jobling and Company Ltd.
- Raymond John Bown, Liaison Officer, Imperial Chemical Industries Ltd. For services to the War Office.
- Margaret Ellen Bowyer, Senior Staff Clerk, Ministry of Labour and National Service.
- Major Austen Trevor Boyd, Assistant Command Welfare Officer, Northern Ireland.
- Cassandra Felicity Bragg, Captain, Air Transport Auxiliary, Second in Command of a Pool.
- Percy William Braund, Ex-Soldier Clerk, Grade "A", War Office.
- Alfred Ernest Briggs, Branch Manager, Athens, Cable and Wireless Ltd.
- Edith Amy Bright, Chief Superintendent of Typists, Admiralty.
- Alfred John William Britton, Skipper of the steam trawler Eileen Wayman.
- John Eaton Brookbank, Senior Executive Officer, Ministry of Fuel and Power.
- Alfred Brookes, Research Chemist, British Industrial Plastics Ltd.
- William Thomas Brooks, Assistant Chief Constable, Wiltshire.
- Phyllis Ruth Broome, Honorary Superintendent, Knightsbridge Warehouse, Joint War Organisation of the British Red Cross Society and Order of St. John.
- Alexander Carnegie Brown, Deputy Superintendent, Scottish Branch, His Majesty's Stationery Office.
- Edmund Martin Brown, Secretary, North Midland Divisional Union of Young Men's Christian Associations.
- Hilda Carrie Brown, Chief Billeting Officer, Withernsea Urban District Council.
- Henry Godfrey Brown, MC, lately Staff Clerk, Ministry of Labour and National Service.
- Captain William Newell Browne, Master, SS Olev, Tyne & Wear Shipping Company Ltd.
- Frederick William Brownjohn, Staff Manager, Home Canteen Service, Navy, Army and Air Force Institutes.
- Ernest Cameron Brunton, Chief Engineer Officer, SS Clement T. Jayne, G. Heyn & Sons Ltd.
- Herbert George Bryan, Controller, Production Division, Entertainments National Service Association.
- Reginald Charles Peter Bryan, Civilian Officer, Inter-Service Topographical Department.
- John Bell Bryans, Superintendent, Gordon Smith Institute for Seamen, Liverpool.
- Emma Gertrude Margaret Bryant, Honorary Secretary, Ross-on-Wye Savings Committee.
- William Andrew Bryce, Managing Director, W. Andrew Bryce and Company Ltd.
- William Fuhston Bryson, MB, ChB, DL, Secretary, Enniskillen Hospitality Committee.
- Alexander Buchan, Skipper of the steam drifter Guiding Star.
- Helen Elizabeth Patricia Buck, Captain, Women's Transport Service (First Aid Nursing Yeomanry), Civil Assistant, War Office.
- Walter Ernest Bunce, Skipper of the steam trawler Kingston Chrysoberyl.
- Patience Viola Hawksley Burbury, Civil Assistant, War Office.
- Charles Reginald Burgess, ARAeS, Controller of Repair, De Havilland Aircraft Company Ltd.
- Gerald Merlier Burnell, Works Manager, Cork Manufacturing Company Limited.
- Geoffrey Burnley, lately Senior Administrative Assistant, Ministry of Fuel and Power.
- Agnes Margaret Burns, Lady Convener, Scottish Rest House, Edinburgh.
- Captain Arthur Torrens Burton, MM, lately Air Raid Precautions Officer, Shoreham and Southwick.
- Frederic Moseley Butler, AMIMechE, Chief Maintenance and Certifying Officer, London Region, Ministry of War Transport.
- William Henry Butt, Chief Superintendent, Head Post Office, Birmingham.
- The Honourable Sibyl Buxton, Local Army Welfare Officer (Auxiliary Territorial Service), Metropolitan Essex.
- T/Major Henry James Byrne, Civil Assistant, War Office.
- George William Cable, Shipyard Labour Supply Officer, Ministry of Labour and National Service.
- Bernard Charles Caddy, Electrical Engineer, Admiralty.
- Christopher Thomas Cain, Chief Warden, Civil Defence Wardens Service, Litherland, Liverpool.
- Robert Dixon Caley, DFC, lately Chief Warden, Civil Defence Wardens Service, Leeds.
- Harry Percy Callow, Staff Clerk, Office of the Public Trustee.
- Frederick Sinclair Cameron, lately County Air Raid Precautions Officer, Deputy County Chief Warden, and County Training Officer, Warwickshire.
- Harry Cameron, Chief Officer, ex-SS Talamba, British India Steam Navigation Company Ltd.
- Harold Walter Camp, Traffic Superintendent, Class I, London Telecommunications Region, General Post Office.
- James Campbell, Regional Gas Officer for Scotland, Ministry of Fuel and Power.
- The Reverend John McCormack Campbell, FSA (Scot), JP, Officiating Chaplain to the Forces, Military Prison and Detention Barracks, Riddrie and Mossbank.
- Observer Lieutenant Thomas Cant, Royal Observer Corps.
- Beryl Garden, Nursing Matron in Chief, Prison Nursing Service.
- Alfred Carr, lately Air Raid Precautions Sub-Controller, Hailsham.
- George Hector Carruthers, Secretary, Durham Orthopaedic Association.
- Ronald Carswell, ARIAS, LRIBA, Assistant Architect, Department of Health for Scotland.
- Charles William Edwin Gary, Managing Director, William E. Gary Ltd.
- Frank Rupert Casey, Commissioner for the Church Army in the Middle East.
- Joseph Caslake, (Junior), Technical and General Manager, J. Caslake Ltd.
- Wilkins Edward Catchpole, Skipper of the steam trawler Eudocia.
- Doris Maud Catt, Senior Chief Superintendent of Typists, Postal and Telegraph Censorship Department.
- John Chadwick, AMInstCE, Borough Engineer and Surveyor, Bury. For services to Civil Defence.
- Geoffrey Francis Challinor, Works Manager, Girling Ltd.
- Leonard Hough Challis, MIAE, Regional Maintenance and Certifying Officer, Northern Region, Ministry of War Transport.
- Mabel Winifred Jeannette Chamberlain, Higher Clerical Officer, India Office.
- Arthur John Chambers, Director and Works Manager, Projectile and Engineering Company Ltd.
- Alison Yvonne Chamtaloup, Personal Assistant to Director-General, Emergency Medical Service.
- Arthur Raymond Chance, Manager, Valve Department, E. K. Cole Ltd.
- Mary Maxwell-Channell, Managing Director, Erinex Ltd.
- Harold Conrad Chapell, Head Postmaster, Guernsey.
- Adele Christina Le Bourgeois Chapin, JP, Regional Transport Officer, Volunteer Car Pool, South Eastern Civil Defence Regional Headquarters.
- Henry Edward Chaplin, Chief Project Engineer, Fairey Aviation Company Ltd.
- Observer Commander Florian Hubert Charlton, DSO, Royal Observer Corps.
- Harry William Charman, Staff Officer, Offices of the Cabinet and Minister of Defence.
- Thomas Cheadle, Assistant Administrative Officer, Pioneer Corps Records Office, Southern Command, War Office.
- Frederick Harold Chester, Chief Fire Officer, Air Transport Auxiliary.
- James Swinburne Chicken, Chief Engineer Officer, SS Icemaid, Stephenson Clarke Ltd.
- Ernest George Childs, Director, Appleby and Childs.
- Captain David Cameron Chisholm, MC, Regional Officer, Group 4, London Civil Defence Region.
- Olive Margaret Christopher (Mrs. Margerison), Clerical Assistant, Offices of the Cabinet and Minister of Defence.
- Ronald Frederick Church, Deputy Director, Ministry of Information.
- John Churcher, Chief Engineer Officer, ST Empire Katy, Pedder & Mylchreest.
- Percy Clare, Honorary Secretary, Bermondsey Local Information Committee.
- William Watson Clark, MC, Staff Officer, Colonial Office.
- Donald Duncan Joseph Clarke, lately District Officer, London County Council Rescue Service.
- Frank Leslie Clarke, Chief Draughtsman, Taylorcraft Aeroplanes (Eng.) Ltd.
- Joan Elisabeth Lowther Clarke, employed in a Department of the Foreign Office.
- Colonel Mervyn Officer Clarke, DSO, lately Air Raid Precautions Officer, Buckinghamshire.
- Doris Marion Clayton, Passenger Relations Officer, British Overseas Airways Corporation.
- May Clayton, Private Secretary, British Army Staff, Washington.
- Charles Clayton Clear, Head of Section, Ministry of Education.
- Edmund Goldsmith Clemson, Sales Manager, General Rubber Goods Division, Avon India Rubber Company.
- Ernest Paul Clift, Theatre Control Officer, Entertainments National Service Association.
- Herbert Arundel Climpson, Brigadier and Red Shield Area Commander, Salvation Army.
- Rosalind Mary Fynes-Clinton, Chairman, Street Groups Sub-Committee, Reading Savings Committee.
- Lieutenant-Colonel Percy Lionel Coates, DSO, TD, Staff Officer, North West Command, Air Training Corps.
- Rita Cohen, lately Civil Defence Welfare Organiser, City of London.
- Thomas Cole, Principal Staff Officer, War Office.
- Wilfrid Cole, Divisional Officer, No. 6 (Southern) Regional Fire Headquarters.
- Derek John Richard Coles, MC, lately Hospital Secretary, Ministry of Pensions Hospital, Cosham, Portsmouth.
- Arthur Richard Collins, MSc, PhD, AMInstCE, Scientific Officer, Road Research Laboratory, Department of Scientific and Industrial Research.
- Ethel Mabel Collum, Chairman, Chelsea Savings Committee.
- Graham John Colmer, MC, Army Liaison Officer, Entertainments National Service Association.
- Aristides Colombos, Port Fishery Officer, Poole.
- Learie Nicholas Constantine, Welfare Officer, Ministry of Labour and National Service.
- George Henry Conway, Assistant Chief Warden, Civil Defence Wardens Service, Liverpool.
- Henry Denman Cook, MSc, lately Regional Officer, Grade II, Southern Civil Defence Region.
- Sybil Cook, Senior Superintendent of Typists, War Damage Commission.
- Graham Thomas Cooke, Works Manager, Mulliners Ltd.
- Leslie Charles Coombes, Constructor, Admiralty.
- Collingwood Cooper, Staff Assistant to Traffic Officers, York, London and North Eastern Railway Company.
- James Marchfoanks Cooper, lately Works Manager, Imperial Chemical Industries (Explosives) Ltd.
- John Cooper, Colliery Manager, Consett Iron Company, Ltd.
- Thomas Charles Coote, Research Officer, Ministry of Town and Country Planning.
- Alfred Geoffrey Corah, Honorary Treasurer, Sussex and Surrey Divisional Union of Young Men's Christian Associations.
- Ernest Corbey, JP, Secretary, National Amalgamated Society of Operative House and Ship Painters and Decorators Approved Society, and National Association of Trade Union Approved Societies.
- Abraham Costa, First Class Clerk, Supreme Court of Judicature.
- James Henry Cotton, Works Manager, Dubilier Condenser Company.
- Thomas Henry Cotton, for services to the Joint War Organisation of the British Red Cross.Society and Order of St. John.
- James Couper, Honorary Secretary, County of Shetland Local Savings Committee.
- Ida Margaret Christina Courtis, Regional Volunteer Car Pool Officer, Wales Region, Women's Voluntary Services. For services to Civil Defence.
- John Coutts, Chief Transport Officer, Headquarters, St. Andrew's Ambulance Association, Glasgow.
- Charles Ernest Coward, Senior Executive Officer, Ministry of National Insurance.
- Albert Coxall, Skipper of the steam trawler Jenwil.
- Captain Hugh Crail, MC, Superintendent, No. 2 Repairable Equipment Depot, Royal Air Force.
- Cecil George Crawley, employed in a Department of the Foreign Office.
- John Creasey, Joint Honorary Secretary, Wimborne Savings Committee.
- Oswald Ross Creasy, Principal Assistant, Estates, and Housing Department, London County Council. For services to Civil Defence.
- Albert John Creedy, Staff Officer, Air Ministry.
- Andrew James Critten, JP, lately Mayor of Southwold. For services to Civil Defence.
- Alexander Stewart Crockett, Skipper of the steam trawler Fair Isle.
- William Montgomery Cronin, Town Clerk of Newry, County Down.
- Jeannette Dorothy Cross, Executive Officer, Board of Trade.
- Shadrach Crowther, Managing, Director, S. Crowther Ltd.
- Captain John William Culbertson, Master, SS Lesto, Felton Steamship Company Ltd.
- Winifred Maud Culling, employed in a Department of the Foreign Office.
- Ida Hettie Willis-Culpitt, Private Secretary to Director of European Broadcasts, British Broadcasting Corporation.
- Virginia Beatrice Cunard, Chief Officer for Nursing Cadets, St. John Ambulance Brigade.
- John Percy Cuninghame, General Secretary, Birmingham Citizens Society.
- James Cunningham, Shop Manager, Aitohison Blair Ltd.
- George Alfred Curphey, Chief Engineer Officer, SS Esneh, Moss Hutchison Line Ltd.
- Flight Captain William Cuthbert, Senior Officer No. 2 Ferry Pool, Air Transport Auxiliary.
- John Thomas Cuthbertson, Chairman, Durham County Committee of the British Legion.
- Gladys Anyan Danby, LMSSA, County Superintendent, Somerset, St. John Ambulance Brigade.
- James Henry Daniels, Principal Assistant, London County Council. For services to Civil Defence.
- Observer Lieutenant Ronald Petrie Darbyshire, Royal Observer Corps.
- Albert Wffljam Davey, Staff Officer, Offices of the Cabinet and Minister of Defence.
- The Reverend Robert Raymond Davey, lately Centre and Mobile Canteen Leader, Young Men's Christian Association, Middle East.
- Bernard William Ireland Davies, Director, B. & J. Davies Ltd.
- Observer Lieutenant David Garfield Davies, Royal Observer Corps.
- David Spurrell Davies, Local Fuel Overseer, Shrewsbury.
- Idris Lewis Davies, Chief Staff Officer, Board of Trade.
- Ivor Graham Davies, Senior Staff Officer, Ministry of Health.
- John Rees Davies, Honorary Secretary, Aberysrwyth Savings Committee.
- Joshua James Davies, lately Air Raid Precautions Officer, Carmarthenshire.
- William Evan Davies, Chairman, Llanelly Savings Committee.
- Doreen Hilda Davis, Personal Secretary to Sector Hospital Officer, Sector V, London.
- Margaret Katharine Davis, Area Officer, No. 36 (London) Fire Force, National Fire Service.
- Howard Henry Dawes, Principal Staff Officer, War Office.
- Arthur Day, Skipper of the steam trawler Onward.
- John Burn Day, Chief Engineer Officer, SS Foreland, Shipping & Coal Company Ltd.
- John Thomas Day, lately Group Officer, Overseas Column, National Fire Service.
- Captain Charles Graham Troughton Dean, Captain of Invalids and Adjutant, Royal Hospital, Chelsea.
- Ada Mary Deeming, Matron, Birmingham Small Arms Company Ltd.
- Charlotte Mary Dellow, Assistant, Board of Trade, recently employed in the Ministry of Production.
- Ernest de Lloyd, Chief Clerk to the Medical Officer of Health, Newport, Monmouthshire. For services to Civil Defence.
- Charlotte Mathilde Denman, Civil Assistant, War Office.
- Senior Commander Alys Dyke Dennis, Administrative Welfare Officer, Auxiliary Territorial Service, Western Command.
- Major Charles Edward de Salis, employed in a Department of the Foreign Office.
- Cecil Havilland de Sausmarez, recently employed in a Department of the Foreign Office.
- June Isabel de Trafford, lately Chief Petrol Officer, Joint War Organisation of the British Red Cross Society and Order of St. John.
- Brenda Ruth Dewey, Assistant, Board of Trade, recently employed in the Ministry of Production.
- Thomas Downing Dewsnap, Major, Salvation Army. For services to the Forces overseas.
- Mary Norman Dixon, Personal Assistant to the Chairman, Board of Management, Navy, Army and Air Force Institutes.
- Robert Dixon, General Manager, J. Russell & Company.
- Robert Bixon, Assistant to Chief Docks Manager, Great Western Railway Company.
- Robert Leonard Dixon, Senior Staff Officer, Dominions Office.
- John Alexander Doig, Managing Director, John S. Doig (Grimsby) Ltd.
- John Stewart Donald, Assistant Engineer, Ministry of Fuel and Power.
- Harry Donnan, Chief Officer, SS Chloris, Moss Hutchison Line Ltd.
- Gerard Doorakkers, Sales Manager, Sheepbridge Stokes Centrifugal Castings Company Ltd.
- Lewis Hugh John Dorey, Divisional Officer (Chief Clerk), No. 36 (London) Fire Force Headquarters, National Fire Service.
- Hilda Olive Eugenie Dorington, Welfare Officer for Auxiliary Territorial Service and Women's Auxiliary Air Force in the North Riding of Yorkshire.
- George Douglas, lately Chief Engineer Officer, SS Beauly, William Sloan & Company.
- Wilfrid Charles Douglas, lately Fire Guard Officer, Northampton.
- Norman Richardson Douglass, Chief Engineer Officer, SS Cyrus Field, Western Union Telegraph Company.
- Reginald William James Downton, Senior Staff Officer, No. 9 (Midland) Regional Fire Headquarters, National Fire Service.
- Charles Tristan D'Oyly, Divisional Commander, Metropolitan Police Special Constabulary.
- George Stirling Draffen, Divisional Officer, Headquarters Staff, National Fire Service, Scotland.
- Joseph Adam Drennan, Chief Refrigerating Engineer Officer, MV Clan Macdonald, Cayzer, Irvine & Company.
- Carol Iris Dreyfus, Static Centre Leader, Young Men's Christian Association, British Army of the Rhine.
- T/Major Donald Stanley Duke, Civil Assistant, War Office.
- Geoffrey William Arnold Dummer, Principal Scientific Officer, Telecommunications Research Establishment, Ministry of Aircraft Production.
- John Henderson Dunbar, First Officer, SS Redhall, Aberdeen Coal and Shipping Company Ltd.
- Lieutenant-Colonel Hugh Robert Swanston Duncan, Assistant County Army Welfare Officer, Wiltshire.
- Cyril Newmarch Leslie Alleyne Dunderdale, Manager, Bowling Installation, Petroleum Board.
- Claude Vincent Dunkley, Head of Out-of-Gauge Load Section, Chief Civil Engineer's Department, London Midland and Scottish Railway Company.
- David Dunlop, Chief Engineer Officer, SS Donaghadee, John Kelly Ltd.
- Mary Sheila Cathcart Dunlop (Lady Killanin), lately employed in a Department of the Foreign Office.
- Matthew Dunlop, General Secretary, British Order of Ancient Free Gardeners Approved Friendly Society.
- Albert Edward Dunn, Second Engineer Officer, SS William Cash, Stephenson Clarke Ltd.
- John Stewart Eagles, Joint Honorary Secretary. National Savings Advisory Committee of the Licensed Trade.
- Evelyn Vera Earl, employed in a Department of the Foreign Office.
- James Ernest Earl, Senior Shipping Assistant, Ministry of War Transport.
- Vivienne Joan Beauchamp Easton, Private Secretary to Head of Wounded, Missing and Relatives Department, Joint War Organisation of the British Red Cross Society and Order of St. John.
- Cyril Horace Eastop, Senior Staff Officer, Air Ministry.
- William Joseph Eaton, Foundry Supervisor, Magnesium Elektron Ltd.
- Charles Edward Ebbutt, Lay Organiser of Civil Defence Casualty Services and Staff Officer to Medical Officer of Health, Croydon.
- Charles Henry George Eburne, Executive Officer, General Post Office.
- Margaret Moore Ede, County Borough Organiser, Worcester, Women's Voluntary Services. For services to Civil Defence.
- Arthur Dennis Edmunds, Organiser of War-time Nurseries in Birmingham. For services to Civil Defence.
- Richard Rodney Wales Edward, Technical Assistant to Medical Director-General, Admiralty.
- Baden John Edwards, Chief Engineer and Technical Manager, Pye Ltd.
- Eva Mary Edwards, Sister in Charge, Auxiliary Centre for Women, Monsall Hospital, Manchester.
- Oscar John Edwards, Port Officer (London Area), Ministry of War Transport.
- Marie-Rose Therese Egan, employed in a Department of the Foreign Office.
- Arthur Albert Ellery, Staff Officer, Ministry of Information.
- George Elliott, Skipper of the steam trawler Toronto.
- Edith Ellis, County Director, Durham Branch, British Red Cross Society.
- Henry Alfred Ellis, Senior Executive Officer, Ministry of Aircraft Production.
- Herbert Mimes Ellis, Transport and Decontamination Officer, Civil Defence Services, Birkenhead.
- Thomas John Ellis, Local Fuel Overseer, Hawarden Rural District.
- Edwin Joseph Embleton, lately Head of Section, Ministry of Information.
- Evan Alfred Charles Evans, Clerk to the Luton Rural District Council. For Services to Civil Defence.
- The Reverend George William Evans, Chaplain Superintendent, Mersey Missions to Seamen.
- Lily Fernellamy Evans, JP, Founder and Organiser of the Forces House Canteen, Dagenham, Essex.
- Captain Robert George Evans, JP, Honorary Secretary, North Wales Fuel Efficiency Committee.
- Stanley Maurice Evans, ARIBA, Architectural Officer and Officer-in-Charge, Civil Defence Rescue Service, Middlesex.
- William Herbert Evans, Superintendent, Cardiff City Police. For services to Civil Defence.
- Fanny Everdell, lately Matron-in-Charge, Highfield Public Assistance Institution, Sunderland.
- Major Douglas Hugh Everett, DPhil, Civil Assistant, War Office.
- Ethel Jean Ewart, Senior Staff Officer, Ministry of National Insurance.
- Lilian Louise Excell, lately Staff Officer, Ministry of Aircraft Production.
- The Reverend James Kingsley Fairbairn. For services to Civil Defence in Clydebank.
- Florence Emily Fantom, Welfare Officer, Accles and Pollock Ltd.
- Councillor Annabel Windsor Farnfield, JP, Honorary Secretary, Hastings Local Savings Committee.
- Captain William Henry Featherston, JP, Divisional Commander, Harrogate Division, War Reserve Special Constabulary.
- Luther Featherstone, Works Manager, Prince-Smith & Stells Ltd.
- Mary Anderson Fell, Clerk, Grade I, Colonial Office.
- Captain Thomas Ferguson, Master, ST Empire Pat, Pedder & Mylchreest.
- Albert Edward George Fiddy, Clerk, Grade II, War Office.
- James Findlay, Skipper of the steam trawler Strathderry.
- Muir Pringle Finlay, WS, lately Column Officer, South Eastern Area of Scotland, National Fire Service.
- Helen Finney, Secretary, Women's Emergency Helpers Organisation, Cairo.
- Harold Kenneth Firth, Clerk, Civil Defence Committee, Emergency Committee and Invasion Committee, Halifax.
- Albert Henry Fisher, Skipper of the steam trawler Eton.
- Thomas William Fisher, Works Superintendent, Hydraulic Coupling & Engineering Company Ltd.
- William Blain Fleming, Assistant Yard Manager, Greenock Dockyard Company Ltd.
- Councillor Percy Fletcher, JP, Chairman, Heckmondwike Local Savings Committee.
- Charles Sydney Flint, Head of Branch, Ministry of Food.
- James George Flint, MIEE, Chief Engineer, Telephone Manufacturing Company Ltd.
- Constance Gertrude Fogg, Registrar of Births and Deaths, Prescot.
- Walter Foister, Assistant Controller, London Postal Region, General Post Office.
- Edwin Robert Ford, lately Chief Warden, Civil Defence Wardens Service, Swansea.
- Winifred Gale Foreman, Secretary, Transport of Wounded Department, Joint War Organisation of the British Red Cross Society and. Order of St. John.
- Winifred Frances Forge, Personal Assistant to Commander-in-Chief, Middle East Forces.
- Freda Forster, Honorary Secretary, Chester-le-Street Savings Committee.
- James Forsyth, Electrician, SS Stratheden, Peninsular & Oriental Navigation Company.
- Alice Marie Sophia Foster, lately Regional Woman Fire Officer, No. 8 (Wales) Fire Region, National Fire Service.
- Margaret Elsie Foster, JP, lately Secretary, South Bank Citizens' Advice Bureau.
- Captain David Spencer Fox, Master, SS Edern, Chain's Stern & Company Ltd.
- Albert Foyer, Assistant Censor, Postal and Telegraph Censorship Department.
- Arthur James Francis, Chief Inspector of Ships' Provisions, Ministry of War Transport.
- Ethel May Frary, Home Sister and Sister Tutor, Nottinghamshire County Sanatorium.
- Aidie Isobel Hutton Fraser, Chief Welfare Superintendent, Navy, Army and Air Force Institutes.
- Annie Fraser, Principal Clerk, Savings Department, General Post Office.
- Charles Fraser, MC, DCM, MM, BEM, Co-ordinating Officer for Civil Defence, Glasgow.
- Captain Henry Austin Fraser, Master, SS Colon, MacAndrews & Company Ltd.
- Lydia May Freeth, Commander, Training Centre, First Aid Nursing Yeomanry.
- Richard Watson Frow, for services to bee-keeping.
- Thomas Alan Furse, Commander, Mobile Division, Birmingham Special Constabulary.
- Phyllis Gabell, Civil Assistant, War Office.
- John Henry Galloway, lately Staff Officer, Principal Probate Registry.
- Harold William Gannaway, Senior Staff Officer, Board of Trade, recently employed in the Ministry of Production.
- James David Garmory, First Officer Flight Engineer, Air Transport Auxiliary.
- Irene, Lady Gater, Organiser, War Workers' Canteen, National Gallery.
- David Martin Gaunt, employed in a Department of the Foreign Office.
- Joseph Gaunt, Machine Shop Superintendent, Joseph Lucas Limited, Burnley.
- Malcolm Gavin, Head of Special Radio Group, General Electric Company.
- Reginald Gayter, Director, Gayter and Cresswell (Tools) Ltd.
- Arthur Smith Gee, lately Chief Warden, Civil Defence Wardens Service, Lincoln.
- Captain Lawrence James Georgeson, Master, SS Wimbledon, Wandsworth & District Gas Company.
- Geoffrey William Essington Ghey, Head of Science Department, Royal Naval College, Eaton, Chester.
- Marguerite Gladys Mary Primrose Gibson, Member, East Lothian Agricultural Executive Committee. Member, Committee of Management, Scottish Women's Land Army Welfare & Benevolent Fund.
- Marjorie Joan Gilbart, Clerical Officer, Ministry of War Transport.
- James Young Laurie Gilchrist, Deputy Fire Force Commander, No. 4 Eastern (Scotland) Area, National Fire Service.
- William Henry Gilkes, lately First Class Officer, Ministry of Labour and National Service.
- Richard Norris Gill, lately Officer-in-Charge, Training and Operations, Civil Defence Reserve Unit, Liverpool.
- Robert Gilmour, PhD, MIChemE, Chemical Engineer, Distillers Company Ltd.
- Doreen Clare Gilshenan, Assistant to Assistant Divisional Food Officer, South Western Division, Ministry of Food.
- Alfred William Glackan, Chief Clerk, Headquarters, 8th Anti-Aircraft Group, War Office.
- Thomas Henry Glasse, Staff Officer, Foreign Office.
- Frederick John Glegg, Civil Defence Welfare Officer, Aberdeen.
- Stanley James Godfrey, Head of Freight Train Running Section, Great Western Railway Company.
- Henry Claude Golder, Senior Technical Officer, Ministry of Aircraft Production.
- Kathleen Mary Goldney, Assistant Regional Administrator, North Western Region, Women's Voluntary Services. For services to Civil Defence.
- Observer Commander Norman James Hicks Goodchild, Royal Observer Corps.
- Eric William Goode, Chief Ground Engineer, Marshall Flying Schools Ltd.
- Major Charles Harold Goodland, TD, lately Air Raid Precautions Controller, Taunton, Somerset.
- Martha Sabrina Gordon, JP, Organiser for County Durham, Women's Voluntary Services. For services to Civil Defence.
- Ernest James Gosford, Principal Clerk, Ministry of Pensions.
- Constance Macgregor, Lady Gowers, Chairman, Gordon Services Club.
- Donald Thompson Graham, Assistant Managing Director, Singer Manufacturing Company Ltd.
- Ernest Cater Graham, Assistant Director, Headquarters, Overseas Section, Joint War Organisation of the British Red Cross Society and Order of St. John.
- Jocelyn Edith Katherine Mould Graham, Chairman, Northumberland and Durham War Needs Fund.
- Walter Hill Graham, Secretary, China Clay Producers' Federation.
- Thomas Grant, Chief Designer, Cockburns Ltd.
- John Pickup Gray, Chief Engineer Officer, SS Empire Gallop, British & Continental Steamship Company Ltd.
- John Thomas Gray, Chief Engineer Officer, SS Camberwell, South Metropolitan Gas Company.
- Vivian Seaton Gray, Clerk to Whitby Urban District Council, and lately District Air Raid Precautions Controller.
- Observer Commander Thomas Edward Grayson, Royal Observer Corps.
- Maud Watrous Grazebrook, Assistant Director, Foreign Relations Department, Joint War Organisation of the British Red Cross Society and Order of St. John.
- May Isabella McConnell Greaves, County Secretary, British Red Cross Society, West Riding of Yorkshire.
- Alexander McWatt Green, Secretary, St. Andrew's Ambulance Association, Edinburgh Area.
- Daisy Green, County Organiser, Glamorgan, Women's Voluntary Services. For services to Civil Defence.
- Fred Green, General Manager and Secretary, Humber Shipwright Company Ltd.
- George Green, Superintendent (Telegraphs), Head Post Office, Sheffield.
- George William Green, Manager of a Government Training Centre, Ministry of Labour and National Service.
- Colonel Leonard Green, CB, MC, TD, DL, Commandant, Lancashire Special Constabulary.
- Leslie Lovell Green, Officer in charge, Post Air Raid Services, Leicester.
- Mary Elizabeth Green, Clerical Officer, Offices of the Cabinet and Minister of Defence.
- Roy Wallace Green, Chief Engineer, Aldridge & Ranken Ltd.
- Flying Officer Leslie Bryan Greensted, RAFO, Chief Test Pilot, Rotol Ltd.
- Alexandra Mary Gregory, lately Senior Assistant, Ministry of Works.
- May Isabella Greig, Assistant County Director, City of Edinburgh Branch, Joint War Organisation of the British Red Cross Society and Order of St. John.
- Captain William Greig, Master, MV Empire Cape, Dundee, Perth & London Shipping Company Ltd.
- William John Gresty, Chief Engineer Officer, SS Lancashire Coast, Coast Lines Ltd.
- Henry Amos Gridley, Staff Clerk, Office of HM Procurator-General and Treasury Solicitor.
- John Grieve, Experimental Engineer, Cunliffe-Owen Aircraft Ltd.
- David Alfred Griffiths, Senior Establishment Officer, Central Ordnance Depot, War Office, Didcot.
- Ernest Grimes, DCM, Clerk, Grade III, War Office.
- William Herbert Grinsted, MIEE, Chief Engineer, Telephones, Siemens Brothers & Company Ltd.
- Henry Charles Groom, Staff Officer, Ministry of War Transport.
- William Stanley Grove, Works Foreman, Wandsworth Repair Depot, London County Council. For services to Civil Defence.
- Stanley Thomas Groves, Deputy Victualling Store Officer, Admiralty.
- Dorothy Gunn, employed in a Department of the Foreign Office.
- Eileen Mary Gunn, Staff Officer, Home Office.
- Charles Haggart, Clerical Officer, War Office.
- Douglas Haigh, lately Seamen's Welfare Officer, Ministry of Labour and National Service.
- Arthur Jarrams Hall, Chief Maintenance Engineer, English Electric Company Ltd.
- William Hall, Colliery Manager, Whitwick Colliery Company Ltd.
- Frederick Halliday, lately Air Raid Precautions Officer and Fire Guard Officer, Wakefield.
- Margaret Graham Hamilton, Assistant Regional Administrator, Eastern and South-Eastern Regions, Women's Voluntary Services. For services to Civil Defence.
- Colonel Sackville William Sackville Hamilton, DSO, Royal Engineers (Retd.), lately Air Raid Precautions Officer, Dorset.
- Albert Michael Hammond, Assistant Regional Manager, Cambridge, War Damage Commission.
- Robert Gary Hampton, Branch Manager, Far East, Cable and Wireless Ltd.
- Flight Captain William Hampton, Air Transport Auxiliary.
- Samuel Hann, First Electrician, SS Queen Elizabeth, Cunard White Star Ltd.
- Gilbert Hannah, Equipment Officer, National Council of Young Men's Christian Associations for England, Wales and Ireland.
- Stanley George Powell Hannam, Waterguard Surveyor, Board of Customs and Excise.
- Flight Captain Guy Wilfrid Harden, Air Transport Auxiliary.
- Henry Leonard Harding, Manager, Ebonite Department, The India Rubber, Gutta Percha & Telegraphs Works Company Ltd.
- Dorothy Hepburn Hardisty, General Secretary, The Refugee Children Movement Ltd.
- William Abraham Hargreaves, AMInstCE, FRAeS, Works Manager, Blackburn Aircraft Ltd., Dumbarton.
- Captain Angus Harkness, Master, SS Brora, William Sloan & Company.
- Florence Emily Harley, Clerical Officer, Offices of the Cabinet and Minister of Defence.
- Winifred Frances Molly Harman, lately Chief Billeting Officer, Eton Rural District Council.
- Henry Gerald Harper, MM, lately Technical Adviser, Civil Defence Rescue Service, Birmingham.
- Charles Hedley Harris, Chief Billeting Officer, Loughborough Council.
- Lieutenant-Colonel Herbert Isidore Harris, Censor, Postal and Telegraph Censorship Department.
- Charles Harrison, Director, Pitwood Export Ltd., Moncton, New Brunswick, Canada.
- Maud Alice Harrison, Secretary to the Superintendent-in-Chief, St. John Ambulance Brigade.
- Philip William Benson Harrison, PhD, Senior Scientific Officer, Ministry of Aircraft Production.
- Smith Harrison, Manager, Bomb and Shell Department, Charles Roberts & Company, Ltd.
- Thomas Harrison. For services to bookbinding.
- Katherine Georgina May Hart, County Borough Organiser for Londonderry, Women's Voluntary Services. For services to Civil Defence.
- Albert Victor Jeffrey Harvey, Staff Officer, Board of Inland Revenue.
- John Bridges Harvey, Staff Officer, Air Ministry.
- Percy Reginald Harwood, Assistant Director, Denny, Mott & Dickson Ltd.
- Councillor Thomas Christopher Harwood, TD, JP, lately Air Raid Precautions Sub-Controller, Rochester.
- Francis William Haslett, Civil Defence and Air Raid Precautions, Officer, Belfast.
- Alfred Hatton, Skipper of the steam trawler Algema.
- Maurice Hewitt Hawkins, Senior Staff Officer, Air Ministry.
- James Hay, Works Manager, T. R. Dowson & Company, Ltd.
- James Joseph Gurnet Hay, Assistant Line Superintendent Hythe Maintenance Base, British Overseas Airways Corporation.
- Henry Hayhow, FSAA, Local Fuel Overseer, Lambeth.
- Bertie Hazell, Labour Representative, West Riding of Yorkshire War Agricultural Executive Committee. District Organiser, National Union of Agricultural Workers.
- Patrick Bernard Healey, General Works Manager, Telephone Manufacturing Company Ltd.
- Richard Gordon Helsby, Managing Editor, Egyptian Mail and Egyptian Gazette.
- Walter William Henderson, Assistant Secretary, Territorial Army and Air Force Association, County of Durham.
- Caroline Johnston Hendry, Commandant, Angus/24, Joint War Organisation of the British Red Cross Society and Order of St. John.
- John Morton Hepburn, Assistant Manager and Personnel Manager, Burntisland Shipbuilding Company Ltd.
- Robert Herd, Skipper of the motor boat Golden Lily.
- Edith Charlotte Hibbard, Assistant Inspector I, Ministry of Aircraft Production.
- Leslie Warwick Hickin, Chief Electrician, SS Derbyshire, Bibby Line.
- Ernest Charles Higman, LRIBA, Local Fuel Overseer, Liskeard Rural District and Looe Urban District.
- Florence Rosa Hilder, Higher Grade Staff Clerk, Ministry of Labour and National Service.
- Eve Keturah Hill, JP, Organiser and Secretary Citizens' Advice Bureau, Yarmouth, Women's Voluntary Services. For services to Civil Defence.
- George Edward Credghton Hill, Chief Production Engineer, Meter Department, Metropolitan Vickers Electrical Company, Ltd.
- Captain Robert Glen Hill, Local Army Welfare Officer, Western Command.
- Charles Thomson Hiller, lately Assistant Air Raid Precautions Organiser, East Suffolk.
- Derek Percy Hilton, lately Civil Assistant, War Office.
- Sydney Hobbs, Assistant Postmaster, Head Post Office, Portsmouth, Hants.
- Mervyn Hodges, Higher Executive Officer, Air Ministry.
- Marjorie Alice Hodgson, Higher Clerical Officer, Ministry of Information.
- Cyril Hodkinson, General Manager, Littlewoods Mail Order Stores, Ltd.
- James Hogarth, MC, Superintendent, Edinburgh Special Constabulary.
- Edna Maud Hogg, Deputy Chief Billeting Officer, Newcastle upon Tyne.
- Elizabeth Ann Chappell Torrance Hogg, Private Secretary to the Lord Privy Seal.
- George Holland, Acting Secretary, Kent Council of Social Service.
- Margaret Holliday, FRCSI, LRCPI, LM, DTM&H, Resident Medical Officer, Maternity Hospital for the Wives of Officers, Fulmer Chase, Buckinghamshire.
- Captain Frederick Wybert Hollman, Master, MV Ocean Coast, Coast Lines, Ltd.
- Henry George Holmes, HM Inspector, Immigration Branch, Home Office.
- Hubert Holmes, London Manager, Army Auxiliary Workshop, Austin Motor Company, Ltd.
- Alfred Edward Holt, Industrial Sales Superintendent, Central Agency, Ltd.
- George Richard Holt, Chief Clerk, Portsmouth Garrison, Southern Command, War Office.
- T/Major Paul Walter Homberger, Civil Assistant, War Office.
- Samuel John Honywill, Finance Officer, Forestry Commission.
- George Edward Stanley Hornby, lately Metallurgist Admiralty Technical Mission to Canada.
- Douglas Favel Horne, AFRAeS, Production Manager, Halliwells, Ltd.
- Edwin James Horrex, Higher Clerical Officer, Ministry of Civil Aviation.
- Frederick James Horsley, Second Engineer Officer, SS Empire Sunbeam, Sir R. Ropner & Company Ltd.
- Henry Thomas Horsman, Deputy Senior Machinery Inspector, Ministry of Agriculture and Fisheries.
- Sydney Arthur Horwood, Secretary of the Brewers' Society.
- Ralph Brian Hosgood, PASI, Surveyor and Valuer, Shell-Mex & B.P. Ltd.
- Herbert Hotine, Senior Civilian Officer, War Office.
- Hilda Housley, Chairman, Sheffield Savings Centre Sub-Committee.
- Alan Kay Howard, Staff Officer, Air Ministry.
- Frank Lionel Howard, Running Shed Superintendent, Bricklayers' Arms Depot, Southern Railway Company.
- Hilda Jane Howse, Superintendent Matron, Wartime Nurseries, Hackney. For services to Civil Defence.
- Patricia Margaret Hoyes, Area Director, Malcolm Clubs, RAF, North West Europe.
- Alderman Alice Hudson, JP, County Borough Organiser, Eastbourne, Women's Voluntary Services. For services to Civil Defence.
- Charles Edward Hudson, Principal, Ministry of Health.
- Captain Frank Hudson, MC, Technical Officer, Research and Development (Equipment), Ministry of Aircraft Production.
- Margaret Caroline Huggins, Civil Assistant, War Office.
- Captain Edward William Hughes, Acting Secretary, Territorial Army Associations of the Counties of Anglesey and Caernarvon.
- Elizabeth Sydney Hughes, lately Higher Executive Officer, Ministry of National Insurance.
- Joan Lily Amelia Hughes, Flight Captain, Air Transport Auxiliary.
- Henry William Hull, Secretary, Hickson & Welch Ltd.
- George Alfred Hummerstone, Works Manager, British Overseas Airways Corporation.
- Wilfrid Hunt, Manager, Fuze Factory, Ferranti Ltd.
- Charles Ernest Hunter, Assistant Shipyard Manager, Smiths Docks Company Ltd.
- Frederick James Hunter, Staff Officer, Board of Inland Revenue.
- Dorothy Hustler, lately Senior Assistant, Ministry of Production.
- Charles Kerr Hutchinson, Superintendent and Deputy Chief Constable, Kirkcudbrightshire Constabulary.
- Kathleen Hutchinson, Area Organiser, Spen Valley, Women's Voluntary Services. For services to Civil Defence.
- Alice Emma Hyde, Secretary to the Managing Director, United Kingdom Commercial Corporation.
- Walter Hyland, lately Air Raid Precautions Officer, Tunbridge Wells.
- Stanley Ineson, FSAA, Honorary Secretary, Morley Savings Committee.
- Felix Stevens Inglis, Superintendent, Radio Production. Unit, Ministry of Aircraft Production.
- John Ingram, MB, CM, JP, Medical Practitioner, Camp Reception Station, St. Agnes, Southern Command, War Office.
- Leonard Thomas Insley, Signals Officer, Air Service Training Ltd.
- Philip Inwald, MB, BS, MRCS, LRCP, Medical Officer in charge, Civil Defence Mobile First Aid Unit, Islington.
- Leonora Cathery-Isted, Clerical Officer, Office of HM Procurator-General and Treasury Solicitor.
- Edward Jackson, Experimental Engineer, Dunlop Rim & Wheel Company.
- Margaret Wallace Jackson, Civil Assistant, War Office.
- Mary Jackson, Controller of Typists, Ministry of Works.
- Thomas Bowyer Jackson, Secretary, National Federation of Ironmongers.
- David Henry Jacobs, Catering Adviser, Home Office.
- Edwin Richard James, Production Engineer, International Combustion Ltd.
- Harold Francis James, Civil Assistant and Accountant Grade II, Ministry of Civil Aviation.
- Harold Percy James, Higher Executive Officer, Board of Customs and Excise.
- Margaret James, Matron, Ministry of Pensions Hospital, Cosham, Portsmouth.
- Charles Henry Jarman, Staff Officer, Ministry of Supply.
- Alfred George Jenkins, Honorary Secretary, Harpenden Savings Committee.
- Arthur William Jenkins, Specialist, Ministry of Information.
- Kenneth Wing Jesty, Chief Accountant, British Council.
- Charles Ward Johns, Chief Inspector, Vickers-Armstrongs, Ltd., Supermarine Works.
- Albert Edward Johnson, Station Supervisor, Bristol, KLM Royal Dutch Airlines.
- Joan Emily Johnson, Junior Executive Officer, Board of Trade, recently employed in the Ministry of Production.
- Sydney Thomas Johnson, lately Air Raid Precautions Sub-Controller and Air Raid Precautions Officer, Hedon, East Riding of Yorkshire.
- Bridget Elizabeth Johnston, lately Area Officer (Chief Clerk), No. 23 (Worcester) Fire Force, National Fire Service.
- Captain Duncan McDougall Johnston, Master, SS Flying Condor, Clyde Shipping Company, Ltd.
- Observer Commander Cyril James Johnstone, Royal Observer Corps.
- Emma Mary Johnstone, LRCP, LRCS, lately Medical Officer in Charge of Mobile Civil Defence Aid Post, Westminster.
- John Brookes Johnstone, Manager, Experimental Department, Gloster Aircraft Company Ltd.
- Oliver Johnstone, Director and Superintendent Engineer, Milford Engineering and Ship Repairing Works, Ltd.
- Thomas Jolley, Director, Electrical Engineering Department, Admiralty.
- Clifford Percy Jones, Chief Inspector, Rolls-Royce Ltd.
- David Jones, lately Head Postmaster, Tenby, Pembrokeshire.
- Edward Bernard Jones, FSAA, Honorary Secretary, Bury Savings Committee.
- Ellen Gertrude Jones, Matron, Derwen Emergency Hospital and Cripples Training College, Oswestry.
- Francis Edgar Jones, PhD, Senior Scientific Officer, Telecommunications Research Establishment, Ministry of Aircraft Production.
- Frederick George Jones, Senior Sanitary Inspector to Cuckfield Rural District Council. For services to Civil Defence.
- Herbert Edward Jones, Production Manager, Synchronome Company Ltd.
- Isobel Valerie Jones, County Borough Organiser, Newport, Monmouthshire, Women's Voluntary Services. For services to Civil Defence.
- Captain John Huddleston Miller Jones, Master, MV Camroux II, Newcastle Coal & Shipping Company Ltd.
- Lavinia Cellan-Jones, Organiser, Civil Nursing Reserve, Swansea.
- Vincent Tattersall Jones, Production Manager, Automatic Telephone and Electric Company Ltd.
- Norman Jubb, Radio Officer, No. 45 Group, Air Ministry.
- Winifred Alice Judd, County Organiser, Hampshire, Women's Voluntary Services. For services to Civil Defence.
- Daniel Kane, First Officer, SS Corteen, John Kelly Ltd.
- Miriam Kaplowitch, Canteen Organiser, Nottingham, Women's Voluntary Services.
- Kathleen Langley Kayser, JP, Commandant, Eaton Hall Emergency Maternity Home.
- John William Keating, Director and Manager, Campbell & Isherwood Ltd. (Liverpool Branch).
- Henry William Kenneth Kelly, Senior Scientific Officer, Mine Design Department, Admiralty.
- John Mylroie Kelly, BEM, Divisional Officer No. 11 (Southend) Fire Force, National Fire Service.
- Josiah Kelsall, Headmaster, High Southwick Junior Mixed School, Sunderland.
- Eleanor Mary Kemlo, Administrative Officer, Grade I, Foreign Office, recently employed in the Ministry of Economic Warfare.
- Councillor Joseph Kemp, Managing Director and Secretary, Yorkshire Egg Packers, Ltd.
- Frederick Harry Kennett, First Class Officer, Ministry of Labour and National Service.
- Rhoda Violet Cecil Barrington Kennett, Honorary Divisional Secretary and Honorary Treasurer, Soldiers' Sailors' and Airmen's Families Association, Slough.
- Aline Kent, Assistant Supply Officer, Washington, Ministry of Supply.
- Arthur Francis Kent, Chief Technical Officer (Motor Transport), Admiralty.
- Robert Andrew Ker, General Manager, Services Central Book Depot, War Office.
- Gerald Wilkinson Kerin, Principal Clerk, Ministry of Pensions.
- Eileen Mary Kerr, Assistant Secretary, Executive Committee, Joint War Organisation of the British Red Cross Society and Order of St. John.
- William Kerr, Second Engineer Officer, SS Skerries, Clyde Shipping Company Ltd.
- Robert Kidney, Second Engineer Officer, SS Sicilian Prince, Rio Cape Line Ltd.
- Marjorie Mayson Killby, Matron, Joint War Organisation of the British Red Cross Society and Order of St. John.
- Joseph John Killingback, District Controller, Fenchurch Street, London Midland and Scottish Railway Company.
- Walter William Nephi Kilner, Deputy Principal, Ministry of Finance, Northern Ireland.
- Isabel King, JP, County Organiser for County Antrim, Women's Voluntary Services. For services to Civil Defence.
- Sidney George King, Controller, Far East Section, Prisoners of War Department, Joint War Organisation of the British Red Cross Society and Order of St. John.
- William Kinsey, Technical Manager, Hattersley (Ormskirk) Ltd.
- Kathleen Malsbury Kirby, Honorary Secretary, Seaton Savings Committee.
- Helen Outerson Kirk, Head of the Comforts Depot, Dunfermline, Women's Voluntary Services.
- William James Knight, lately Manager, Cocos, Cable and Wireless Ltd.
- Robert Alexander Chapman Laidlaw, Superintendent of Scripture Readers with the British Army of the Rhine.
- Lawrence Francis Lalor, Principal Staff Officer, War Office.
- Cyril Charles Ings Lambert, Principal Clerk, Department of Overseas Trade.
- John Joseph Lambert, Dredging Superintendent, Hull, London and North Eastern Railway Company.
- John James Lane, Staff Officer, Scottish Home Department.
- Elizabeth Langmuir, District Organiser, Western District of Scotland, Women's Voluntary Services. For services to Civil Defence.
- Albert Alexander Langridge, Personal Assistant to Traffic Director, KLM Royal Dutch Airlines.
- Kathleen Mary Larkin, Chief Superintendent of Typists, India Office.
- George William Thomas Law, lately Deputy Air Raid Precautions Controller, Woolwich.
- Edward Trice Lawler, Assistant Engineer Works Manager, Vosper Ltd.
- Charles Harry Lawrence, Works Manager, James Purdey & Sons Ltd.
- Charles Laycock, Technical Assistant, Grade I, Admiralty.
- Herbert Thomas Leahy, Area Supervising Engineer, Tractor Service, Department of Agriculture for Scotland.
- John Edward Leary, Assistant Director, Central Statistics Department, Ministry of Supply.
- Ethel Winifred Lee, MB, ChB, County Borough Organiser, Hastings, Women's Voluntary Services. For services to Civil Defence.
- Richard Geoffrey Leech, Local Organiser and Area Leader, London Region Works and Buildings Emergency Organisation.
- Saville Lees, Chairman, Halifax Savings Committee.
- Captain Henry Albert Lego, Master, ST Empire Portland, Townsend Bros.
- Margaret Florence Le Sueur, Clerical Officer, Offices of the Cabinet and Minister of Defence.
- Berthold Lewin, lately Deputy Air Raid Precautions Controller, Chief Warden and Fire Guard Officer, Borough of Stepney.
- Andrew Holmes Spencer Lewis, Shipyard & General Manager, John Lewis & Sons Ltd.
- Charles Sydney Lewis, Senior Ship Surveyor, Ministry of War Transport.
- Frederick Gwynne Lewis, Clerk to Carmarthen Rural District Council. For services to Civil Defence.
- Alderman Constance Leyland, County Borough Organiser, Southend, Women's Voluntary Services. For services to Civil Defence.
- Walter Newton Lindley, Local Fuel Overseer, South Shields.
- John Victor Line, Supervising Collector, Board of Inland Revenue.
- Lieutenant-Colonel Cecil Hunter Little, DSO, lately Air Raid Precautions Officer, Training Officer and Transport Officer, Herefordshire.
- Harry Douglas Little, Assistant Senior Examiner, War Damage Commission.
- Herbert Summers Lloyd, Head Civilian Trainer, War Dogs Training School, War Office.
- William Gordon Lloyd, Engineer, Ministry of War Transport.
- Arthur Lockwood, FSI, Chief Billeting Officer and Rating and Valuation Officer to the Guildford Rural District Council.
- Albert Henry Lomas, Chief Staff Officer, Ministry of War Transport.
- Captain the Right Honourable Ernest William Denison, Baron Londesborough, Royal Navy (Retd.), lately Chief Warden and Fireguard Officer, Civil Defence Wardens' Service, Lewisham.
- Hilda Scott Lones, Deputy Organiser, Lady Mayoress's Comforts Depot, Birmingham. A member of the Women's Voluntary Services.
- Alderman Isabel Lonsdale, Centre Organiser, Redcar, Yorkshire, Women's Voluntary Services. For services to Civil Defence.
- James Lorimer, District Goods and Passenger Manager, Dundee District, London and North Eastern Railway Company.
- Walter Benjamin John Lowe, Chairman, Street Groups Sub-Committee, Coventry Savings Committee.
- Arthur Henry Lower, Production Superintendent, Cosmos Manufacturing Company.
- Peter Lowson, Chief Officer, SS Beaconstreet, Anglo-American Oil Company Ltd.
- Kathleen Sibyl Lucas, County Borough Organiser, Canterbury, Women's Voluntary Services. For services to Civil Defence.
- Reginald William Luck, lately Regional Raid Sporting Officer, South-Eastern Civil Defence Region.
- John Grey Lumley, MINA, Ship Surveyor, Middlesbrough, Lloyd's Register of Shipping.
- Jean Rome Reid McAinsh, Censor, Postal and Telegraph Censorship Department.
- Charles Lennox MacAllister, Chief Engineer Officer, SS Kildrummy, Dundee, Perth & London Shipping Company Ltd.
- John McArthur, Works Manager, Brown and Adam (Engineers) Ltd.
- Matthew McBryde, Senior Electrician, SS Empress of Scotland, Canadian Pacific Steamships Ltd.
- George Grade McCall, Secretary and Executive Officer, Angus Agricultural Executive Committee.
- Captain Donald McCallum, Master, SS Lairdsglen, Burns & Laird Lines Ltd.
- Captain Alfred McCalmont, Master, SS Gracehill, Howdens Ltd.
- Arthur Garside McCulloch, Engineer, Blackburn Aircraft Company Ltd.
- John Livingston MacDonald, Manager, D. Scott & Sons Ltd.
- Thomas Albert McDowell, Secretary, Gloucester War Agricultural Executive Committee.
- Agatha Macfarlane, County Organiser, Surrey, Women's Voluntary Services. For services to Civil Defence.
- Captain Donald McFarlane, Master, SS Hebrides, McCallum Orme & Company Ltd.
- Major James Golder Macfarlane, TD, Officer in charge, Scottish Command Sub-Book Depot.
- Malcolm Macfarlane, Assistant Manager, Scotts Shipbuilding & Engineering Company Ltd.
- William MacGillivray, Unit Controller, North Western Divisional Road Haulage Organisation.
- James MacArthur MacGregor, Area Officer, Assistance Board, Scotland.
- Captain John McGregor, Master, SS Felspar, William Robertson.
- Major-General Alexander Anderson McHardy, CB, CMG, DSO, lately Air Raid Precautions Area Sub-Controller, Norfolk.
- Edith Faith MacKendrick, Head of Royal Air Force Section, Wounded, Missing and Relatives Department, Joint War Organisation of the British Red Cross Society and Order of St. John.
- Alexander MacKenzie, Naval Architectural Draughtsman, Lifeboat Department, Mechans Limited, Scotstoun Iron Works, Glasgow.
- Jean Mackie, Matron, Fife and Kinross District Mental Hospital.
- Catherine Florence MacDonald Mackintosh, Senior Administrative Assistant, Ministry of Fuel and Power.
- Major Donald Og Maclean, MC, Chairman, Crieff Savings Committee.
- Captain David McLeman, Master, SS Barra Head, A. F. Henry & Macgregor Ltd.
- Captain John MacLennan, Master, SS Sojourner, Matthew Taylor.
- Alfred McLoughlin, lately Staff Officer, Ministry of War Transport.
- Captain Donald McMillan, Master, SS St. Magnus, North of Scotland & Orkney & Shetland Steam Navigation Company Ltd.
- William McMinniagle, Director and General Manager, Middle Docks and Engineering Company Ltd.
- James Alexander McNab, Chairman, Tunbridge Wells Savings Committee.
- Colin James McQueen, Clerical Officer, War Office.
- Henry McQueen, Senior Surveyor, Dundee, Lloyd's Register of Shipping.
- Captain John McVicar, Master, SS Macville, Wm. S. Scott & Company.
- Kathleen Juliet Madell, Staff Officer, HM Treasury.
- Robert Hayes Magill, Higher Executive Officer, Ministry of Pensions.
- James Robertson Milne Main, Works Manager, Cardiff Channel Dry Dock & Pontoon Company-Ltd.
- Tom Makemson, Director of Iron Castings, Iron and Steel Control, Ministry of Supply.
- James William George Mangum, Staff Officer, Ministry of Pensions.
- Douglas John Manning, Senior Staff Officer, Board of Trade.
- Martyn Mansfield, Deputy County Borough Organiser, Bristol, Women's Voluntary Services. For services to Civil Defence.
- Olive Hilda Maples, County Borough Organiser for Sheffield, Women's Voluntary Services. For services to Civil Defence.
- Leopold Samuel Marks, Civil Assistant, War Office.
- Dorothy Frances Marriott, County Secretary and County Canteen Assistant, West Sussex, Women's Voluntary Services. For services to Civil Defence.
- Hervey Marsden, Works Manager, Hutchinson & Hollingworth Ltd.
- Robert Braithwaite Marshall, lately employed in a Department of the Foreign Office.
- Esther Martin, Member, Women's Sub-Committee, Local Employment Committee for Leicester and District.
- George William Percy Martin, Senior Assistant, Ministry of Fuel and Power.
- Mary Eleanor Grace Martin, Secretary, Downpatrick Hospitality Committee.
- Phyllis Marjorie Martin, Mobile Canteens Officer for Belfast County Borough, Women's Voluntary Services. For services to Civil Defence.
- Sidney John Martin, Senior Staff Officer, Air Ministry.
- Richard Lawson Martindale, District House Coal Officer, Liverpool.
- Sydney Martindale, Works Manager, H. Braithwaite & Company.
- Arthur Frederick Mason. For services to the Joint War Organisation of the British Red Cross Society and Order of St. John.
- John Charles Bee-Mason, Organiser of the Sussex Bee-Keepers' Association. For services to the Admiralty.
- Maurice Digby Mason, employed in a Department of the Foreign Office.
- Major Peter Geoffrey Mason, employed in a Department of the Foreign Office.
- Leonard Kinsey Massey, Honorary Organiser, Islington Savings Committee.
- Irene Massie, Senior Executive Officer, War Office, Middle East.
- Louis Frank Masson, Head of Section, Ministry of Information.
- Mary Grace Massy, employed in a Department of the Foreign Office.
- Alice Mary Matheson, Junior Assistant, War Office.
- Squadron Leader Richard Lee Mathews, RAFVR, employed in a Department of the Foreign Office.
- Charles Frederick Mathias, Accountant, Ministry of Information.
- Frank Nevill Matthews, Chairman, Finance Committee, British Red Cross Society Agriculture Fund.
- Harold Marten Matthews, Lands Officer, Air Ministry.
- Leonard Frank Matthews, Clerk Ecclesiastical Commission.
- Robert May, Skipper of the steam drifter Ocean Gleaner.
- Frederick William Maycock, Technical Superintendent, Torpedo Department, Morris Motors Ltd.
- George Albert Mayhew, Forge Department, Manager, Ransomes, Sims and Jefferies Ltd.
- Violet Jessie Mayne, Personal Assistant to the Director of Atom Bomb Research, Department of Scientific and Industrial Research.
- Captain John Denys Mead, lately Flying Establishment Officer, Air Transport Auxiliary.
- Stephen Samuel Mears, Co-ordinating Officer, Avonmouth Installations, Petroleum Board.
- John Matthew Mecklenburgh, Skipper of the steam trawler Clougihstone.
- Fred Marshall Medhurst, Managing Director, T. J. Smith & Nephew Ltd.
- Janet Hamilton-Meikle, Chairman, Fife Federation of Scottish Women's Rural Institutes.
- Percy Frederick Mellon, Civil Assistant and Accountant, Grade I, No. 21 Maintenance Unit, Royal Air Force.
- Councillor Margaret Outram Mellows, County Organiser, Soke of Peterborough, Women's Voluntary Services. For services to Civil Defence.
- Robert McGregor Duncan Melville, Chief Engineer Officer, SS Longford, Belfast Steamship Company Ltd.
- Thomas Merrall, Honorary Secretary, Bedford Savings Committee.
- George Leslie Meston, JP, Actuary, Dundee Trustee Savings Bank.
- Albert Edward Metcalfe, AMINA, Assistant Engineering Manager, Amos & Smith Ltd., Hull.
- John Craie Michie, Air Raid Precautions Sub-Controller, Nairn.
- Joseph Middlemas, Traffic Superintendent, Class II, Telephone Manager's Office, Newcastle upon Tyne, General Post Office.
- Harry John Mildren, Assistant Director of Radio Components, Directorate of Communications Components Production.
- Harry Talkington Millar, Sales Engineer, Churchill Machine Tool Company Ltd.
- Arthur Miller, Executive Officer, General Post Office.
- Observer Commander David Miller, Royal Observer Corps.
- Denise Currie Spencer Milligan, Commandant, V.A.D. Glasgow/12 Joint War Organisation of the British Red Cross Society and Order of St. John.
- Joseph Alexander Wallace Mills, Manager, Reyrolles Ltd.
- Theodore Robert Minter, Accountant, Boon and Porter.
- Ethel Mary Modlen, Civil Assistant, War Office.
- William Mogg, DSC, Skipper of the steam trawler Ottilie.
- Flight Captain Edward Courtney Mogridge, Air Transport Auxiliary.
- James Allan Mollison, lately Flight Captain, Air Transport Auxiliary.
- Olive Winter Montgomery, employed in a Department of the Foreign Office.
- Albert Joseph Moore, Senior Officer, Ministry of Health.
- Observer Lieutenant Thomas Henry Moore, Royal Observer Corps.
- William John Morgan, Association Secretary, Machine Tool Trades Association.
- William Robert Morgan, Staff Officer, Ministry of Agriculture and Fisheries.
- Geoffrey Morris, lately Officer, Transport of Wounded Department, Joint War Organisation of the British Red Cross Society and Order of St. John.
- John Massey Morris, Chief Electrical Mechanical Engineer, Port Directorate, Basrah.
- George Alexander Morrison, Chief Steward, SS Nea Hellas, Anchor Line Ltd.
- Captain William McIntyre Morrison, Master, SS Harlow, Aberdeen Steam Navigation Company Ltd.
- Herbert James Morton, Technical Assistant, British Tabulating Machine Company.
- Oscar Filleul Mourant, Head Postmaster, Jersey.
- Harold Ravensdale Mowbray, employed in a Department of the Foreign Office.
- George Moy, Works Superintendent, No. 1 Aero Engine Shadow Factory, Rover Company Ltd.
- Winifred Edith Munns (Mrs. Lane), lately Head of Branch, Ministry of Food.
- John Joseph Murphy, Senior Staff Officer, Admiralty.
- Constance Irene Murray, Clerical Officer, Offices of the Cabinet and Minister of Defence.
- Jean Milne Murray, RRC, lately Matron, Floors Castle Auxiliary Hospital, Kelso, Roxburghshire. For services to Civil Defence.
- John Mackay Murray, Admiralty Liaison Officer, Lloyd's Register of Shipping.
- Margaret Murray, Woman Pension Officer, Board of Customs and Excise.
- Leonard Musgrave, Clerk to Cricklade and Wootton Bassett and Highworth Rural Districts. For services to Civil Defence.
- George Alexander Mussett, MIMarE, Advising Officer, Board of Customs and Defence.
- William Frederick Myrton, lately Section Superintendent, London Aircraft Production Group.
- Harry Thomas Nash, Assistant County Director, County of London Branch, British Red Cross Society.
- Captain William Nash, Master, SS Egret, British and Continental Steamship Company Ltd.
- Chief George Herbert Neale, Honorary Accountant of Sports Committee, Joint War Organisation of the British Red Cross Society and Order of St. John.
- William Turnbull Neill, Assistant Works Manager Scottish Aviation Ltd.
- The Reverend Joseph Morrison Neilson, Supervisor of the Centenary Methodist Church Canteen, St. Saviourgate, York.
- Hugh Lynn Newlands, National Labour Officer, National Dock Labour Corporation Ltd.
- Mabel Victoria Newton, Superintendent of Staff Typists, War Office.
- William Helge Cowell Nicholas, General Manager, Grayson Rollo & Clover Docks Ltd.
- Ellen Nickson, Member, Women's Voluntary Services. For service to the Royal Air Force.
- Frank Iddeson Nickson, JP, Chairman, Blackpool Savings Committee.
- Albert George Nightingale, lately Harbour Engineer, Lowestoft, London and North Eastern Railway Company.
- Alexander Hodge Nisbet, GM, Assistant Fire Force Commander, Western (No. 1) Area, Scotland, National Fire Service.
- Dorothy May Noakes, Technical Assistant to the Deputy Chairman of the Electricity Commission.
- Maurice Henry Norman, lately Deputy Director of Costings, Ministry of Food.
- Victor Charles John North, lately British Pay and Establishment Officer, U.S. Miscellaneous Installations, Western Command, War Office.
- Francis Harold Nunn, Principal Transport Officer, His Majesty's Stationery Office.
- Gertrude Eva Nurse, Honorary Superintendent Registrar, Sutton and Cheam Local Savings Committee.
- George Nutter, Chief Radio Officer, SS Oxfordshire, Bibby Line.
- Muriel Nutting, Centre Organiser, Wandsworth, Women's Voluntary Services. For services to Civil Defence.
- Doris Oates, County President, Flintshire, Women's Voluntary Services. For services to Civil Defence.
- Walter O'Dea, Chief Clerk, Ordnance Depot, War Office, Malta.
- Robert Stavers Oloman, Formerly Chief Warden, Civil Defence Wardens Service, York.
- Margaret Joyce Olsen, Chief Assistant to General Manager, Publicity Department, British Red Cross Society and Order of St. John.
- Timothy Diamond O'Mahony, Staff Officer, Board of Trade.
- Daniel McLennan Oman, MC, Honorary Secretary, West Lothian Local Savings Committee.
- Kathleen Nelson Ommanney, Centre Organiser, Chatham Borough, Women's Voluntary Services. For services to Civil Excise.
- Arthur Osborn, lately Deputy Assistant Curator, Royal Botanic Gardens, Kew.
- Henry Thomas Wilfred Osborne, Billeting Officer, Letchworth Urban District Council.
- Theresa Osborne, Chairman, Evacuation Committee, Yeovil Rural District Council.
- William John Berry Osborne, Higher Grade Clerical Officer, Colonial Office.
- Frank Cameron Osbourn, Secretary, Central Emergency Committee for Opticians.
- Albert James Packer, Food Executive Officer, Ministry of Food.
- Reginald Guy Palmer, Managing Director, Eagle Engineering Company Ltd.
- Lilian Nelly Park, Private Secretary to the Chairman (Headquarters Staff), Cable and Wireless Ltd.
- James Parker, Sub-District Manager, Emergency Road Transport Organisation, Coventry.
- Victor Harold Parker, Chairman, Horticulture and Victory Garden Sub-Committee, British Red Cross Society Agriculture Fund.
- Captain Louis George Duncan Parkes, DSC, Master, SS Parkwood, Joseph Constantine Steamship Line Ltd.
- Ronald Parkinson, Column Officer, No. 1 (Northern) Regional Fire Headquarters, National Fire Service.
- John William Parks, MD, Assistant Medical Officer, General Post Office.
- Willie Parnham, Assistant Chief Constable, Sheffield.
- T/Major Alan Starr Partridge, Deputy Command Land Agent, Southern Command, War Office.
- Grace Elizabeth Partridge, County Superintendent, Leicester and Rutland, St. John Ambulance Brigade.
- Alice Frances Paterson, Clerical Officer, General Post Office.
- Robert Paterson, Chief Engineer Officer, SS Moorlands, Matthew Taylor.
- Lizzie Johnston Patton, Major, Salvation Army. For social work among women and girls in London.
- Samuel Irvine Paul, Works Manager, Engine Department and Boiler Works, Alexander Stephen & Sons Ltd.
- Walter John Pavey, Works Manager, John Laird & Son Ltd.
- Henry Cecil Pawson, MSc, Lecturer in Agriculture at King's College, Newcastle upon Tyne.
- Mary Dorothy Payne, Assistant County Director for Kent, British Red Cross Society.
- Cadet Major Percy Edwin Payne, Assistant Secretary, Territorial Army and Air Force Association, East Riding of Yorkshire.
- Frances Eleanor Peck, General Secretary, Liverpool Personal Service Society (Incorporated), and Citizens Advice Bureau.
- Hilda Mary Peckett, Secretary to the Secretary, Wholesale Clothing Manufacturers' Federation.
- Vernon Trevail Pedlar, Honorary Secretary, Plymouth Savings Committee.
- Arthur John Pegg, Assistant Chief Test Pilot, Bristol Aeroplane Company Ltd.
- John William Henry Pengelly, Chief Engineer, The India Rubber, Gutta Percha and Telegraphs Works Company Ltd.
- Anita Victoria Margherita Pennacchini, Principal Clerk, Ministry of Pensions.
- Hugh Cowan Penny, Air Raid Precautions Training Officer, County of Kirkcudbright.
- Hugh John Perry, JP, District House Coal Officer, Thanet.
- Eric George Peskett, Works Manager, Smith & Sons (England) Ltd.
- Ann Flinders Petrie, employed in a Department of the Foreign Office.
- John Petrie, Joint Managing Director, Belfast Ropework Company Ltd.
- John Pettigrew, Deputy Managing Director, Peter Scott.
- Kathleen Pettigrew, employed in a Department of the Foreign Office.
- Albert Edward Phillips, Purser, SS Tamaroa, Shaw Savill & Albion Company Ltd.
- Andrew Phillips, Works Manager, Radio Transmission Equipment Ltd.
- Major Vivian Mansel George Phillips, Assistant Technical Adviser for Pest Destruction, Ministry of Agriculture and Fisheries.
- William Phillips, Coal Liaison Officer, South Wales, Ministry of War Transport.
- William Alfred Phillips, Staff Officer, War Office.
- Henry Edward Pickman, Honorary Secretary, Maidenhead Savings Committee.
- Joseph Arthur Collingwood Picknell, lately Railway Transport Officer, Ministry, of Fuel and Power.
- Wilfrid Pierce, lately Air Raid Precautions Sub-Controller, Nottingham.
- Arthur Ernest Pike, Deputy Divisional Food Officer, Ministry of Food.
- John Robert Pike, Senior Executive Officer, Ministry of Health.
- Reginald John Reynolds Pike, Staff Officer, Ministry of Civil Aviation.
- Leonard Victor Pillatt, lately Commandant, Civil Defence Rescue and Repair Service, Nottingham.
- Captain Austin Norman Pilling, lately Air Raid Precautions Sub-Controller and County Training Officer, Cornwall.
- Ronald Francis Pink, Local Fuel Overseer, Wadebridge Rural District.
- Henry Alfred Pitcher, MINA, Constructor, HM Dockyard, Rosyth.
- Margaret Pittman, Matron, Parkwood Convalescent Home, Joint War Organisation of the British Red Cross Society and Order of St. John.
- Frank Roy Tilly Pitts, Chief Officer, SS Newlands, W. Tully & Company Ltd.
- Francis John Plenty, Canteen Manager, Gloster Aircraft Company, Ltd.
- Geoffrey Richard Polgreen, MIEE, Chief Engineer., Salford Electrical Instruments, Ltd.
- Archie Porter, Senior Area Road Haulage Officer, Eastern Division, Ministry of War Transport.
- Leonard Vincent Potts, Chief Officer, SS British Tommy, British Tanker Company Ltd.
- Frederick James Powell, War Damage Officer to the Plymouth Corporation.
- Richard Wilmot Poyser, Works Engineer, Bristol Aeroplane Company Ltd.
- George Dowsett Prater, Assistant Accountant, Grade I, Southern Command, War Office.
- Herbert Price, Staff Officer, General Post Office.
- Joseph Price, lately Chief Staff Officer and Training Officer, to Air Raid Precautions Controller, Sunderland.
- William Henry Price, Honorary District Salvage Adviser, Essex.
- Harry Richard Priday, JP, Chairman, Western Area, Road Haulage Wages Board, Area Secretary Transport and General Workers Union. West of England.
- Captain Thomas Foulkes Pritchard, Master, SS Ester Thorden, R. H. Penney and Sons.
- Thomas Proudfoot, Manager, Surgical and Hospital Equipment Department, Savory and Moore, Ltd.
- Owen Standidge Puckle, MIEE, Second in Command of Research Department, A. C. Cossor Ltd.
- John Wynn Pugh, Chief Engineer Officer, SS Themston, S. Instone & Company Ltd.
- Ian Douglas Pullar, AMIEE, Mechanical and Electrical Engineer, Air Ministry.
- Edward Reginald Pyatt, First Officer, Air Transport Auxiliary.
- William Marsland Pye, (Junior), Managing Director, Pye Motors Ltd.
- Leonard Charles Winnicott Pyne, Chief Steward, MV Llangibby Castle, Union Castle Mail Steamship Company Ltd.
- Margaret Hornby Pythian, Higher Executive Officer, Ministry of Aircraft Production.
- Horace Algernon Quilter, Higher Grade Clerk, Ministry of Labour and National Service.
- George Rackham, Principal Clerk and Chief Clerk, National Debt Office.
- Charles Edward Rainbird, Fumigation Officer, Australian Dried Fruits Board, London.
- Harold Ransom, Assistant Director (Radio Valves), Directorate of Communications Components Production.
- Alderman Leslie Henry Ransom, lately Chief Warden, Civil Defence Wardens Service, Surbiton.
- Cecil Arthur Rassier, Director, D. Sebel and Company Ltd.
- Alice Rawes, Matron, Bridge of Earn Emergency Medical Services Hospital, Perthshire.
- Captain Robert Neville Rawlinson, Chief Warden, Civil Defence Wardens Service, Swinton-with-Pendlebury.
- Edwin Thomas Rayner, Principal Staff Officer, War Office.
- John Rayner, employed in a Department of the Foreign Office.
- Herbert Martin Read, Skipper of the steam trawler Cyclamen.
- Theodore Read, Head of Communications Department, British Council.
- James Reaney, Second Engineer Officer, SS Carpio, MacAndrews & Company Ltd.
- Herbert Moses Reay, Principal Clerk, Ministry of Pensions.
- Captain Percy Reay, MC, County Commissioner, Cheshire, Joint War Organisation of the British Red Cross Society and Order of St. John.
- Francis Donald Redington, lately Senior Radio Production Officer, Directorate of Communications Components Production.
- Ronald Stephen Reed, Shipping Assistant, Ministry of War Transport.
- Rosemary Theresa Rees, Captain, Air Transport Auxiliary, Second in Command, No. 15 Ferry Pool.
- Andrew Reid, Works Manager, Colville Constructional Company Ltd.
- Dorothy Isobel Reid (Mrs. Scott), Principal Administrative Officer, Western (No. 2) Area of Scotland, National Fire Service.
- Robert Reid, Skipper of the steam drifter Shooting Stars.
- William Alfred Reid, Assistant Director (Senior Technical Officer), Ministry of Aircraft Production.
- Robert Rennie, Senior Surveyor at Vancouver, Lloyd's Register of Shipping.
- James Rhodes, Executive Engineer, Engineer-in-Chiefs Office, General Post Office.
- Albert Frank Richards, Junior Executive Officer, Ministry of Health.
- David William Richards, Manager, Cardiff Employment Exchange, Ministry of Labour and National Service.
- Edward Arthur Richards, MIME, Chief Rectifier Engineer, Standard Telephones & Cables Ltd.
- Alexander George Richardson, Deputy Assistant Director of Contracts, Ministry of Supply.
- Alfred Herbert Ricketts, Installation Manager, Stanlow Installation, Petroleum Board.
- Robert Rigby, lately County Air Raid Precautions Officer, Isle of Ely.
- Frank Thomas Roach, Station Master, Brighton, Southern Railway Company.
- Major Gerald Finch Roberts, Local Army Welfare Officer, Metropolitan Herts.
- John Fenlli Roberts, lately Air Raid Precautions Coordinating Officer, Flintshire.
- Leslie James Roberts, Staff Officer, General Post Office.
- John MacCulloch Robertson, Chief Fire Officer, Stranraer.
- Captain Thomas Stout Robertson, Master, MV Scottish Co-operator, Scottish Co-operative Wholesale Society Ltd.
- Beatrice Robinson, Centre Organiser, Chesterfield Borough, Women's Voluntary Services. For services to Civil Defence.
- Henry Ogle Robinson, Collector in Charge, Newcastle and Sunderland, Board of Inland Revenue.
- John Robson, Senior Ship Surveyor, Ministry of War Transport.
- Major John Snowdon Robson, JP, Chief Supervisor, Kent Special Constabulary.
- John Dickson Rogers, Senior Staff Officer, Ministry of Supply.
- Harold Rogerson, FRAeS, Chief of Stress and Technical Department, A. V. Roe and Company Ltd.
- William Charles Rolls, Engineer and Chief Draughtsman, Fisher's Foils Ltd.
- William Rome, Senior Regional Officer, Ministry of Works.
- Henry Roper, Works Manager, Robert Davie Senior & Company Ltd.
- Alfred Rose, JP, Local Welfare Officer, Grade I, Ministry of Labour and National Service.
- Doris Mabel Rose, Secretary, Baptist Union War Comforts Fund.
- Charles Frederick Ross, President, North West Federation of Voluntary Land Clubs.
- David Ross, Assistant General Manager, Penarth Pontoon Slipway & Ship Repairing Company Ltd.
- Observer Commander Cyril John Rowlands, Royal Observer Corps.
- Harry Edgar Royston, Dockyard Engineering Manager, Scotts Shipbuilding and Engineering Company Ltd.
- Cicely Bruce Ruck, Group Administrator, Essex and Kent, Women's Voluntary Services. For services to Civil Defence.
- Leonard Guy Rule, Assistant Director, Public Relations, Ministry of Supply.
- Harry Alfred Russell, Chief Chef, SS Queen Elizabeth, Cunard White Star Ltd.
- John Henry Ryan, Skipper of the steam trawler Braes O'Mar.
- Beryl Stratheden Ryland, County Organiser, Warwickshire, Women's Voluntary Services. For services to Civil Defence.
- Barbara Salt, Civil Assistant, War Office.
- William Henry Salthouse, General Manager & Director, William Cubbin, Ltd.
- Muriel Agnes Sample, lately Commandant of the British Red Cross Society Convalescent Home, Guyotville, North Africa.
- Captain Arthur Sandison, Master, SS Lakeland, Currie Line Ltd.
- Walter George Santer, Staff Officer, Board of Trade.
- Frank Stanley Saunders, Superintendent, Engineering Experimental Factory, British Overseas Airway's Corporation.
- Reginald Walter Saunders, lately Air Raid Precautions Officer, Weston-super-Mare.
- Major Cyril Grevills Sawbridge, TD, lately Officer in Charge, Central Report Centre and Deputy Air Raid Precautions Controller, Southampton.
- Oliver Baber Saxby, JP, lately Assistant Air Raid Precautions Officer and County Training Officer, Berkshire.
- Benjamin Joseph Sayer, Superintendent, Naval Supplies, Navy, Army and Air Force Institutes.
- Daisy Maud Sayers, Clerical Officer, Petroleum Warfare Department.
- Leicester Cecil Peregrine Scaife, Regional Manager, Southern Region, Petroleum Board.
- Harold Ernest Scoble, lately Air Raid Precautions Officer, St. Marylebone.
- Henrietta Snow Scott, Officer-in-Charge, Home Economy Department and Fuel Advice Officer, Scottish Regional Headquarters, Women's Voluntary Services. For services to Civil Defence.
- James William Scott, Chief Draughtsman, Searchlight Projector Department, Clarke Chapman & Company, Ltd.
- Janet Scott, lately Matron, Home for Aged and Infirm, Kippington House, Sevenoaks, Kent. For services to Civil Defence.
- Joan Catherine Scott, Secretary Shorthand-Typist, Ministry of Aircraft Production.
- Mary Drusalla Scott, Personal Secretary to Sector Hospital Officer, Sector VI, London.
- Robert Thomas Hunter Scott, Secretary, Trustee Savings Banks Association.
- William Arthur Scott, Superintendent, Royal Ordnance Factory, Patricroft.
- William Errington Scott, MSc, PhD, lately Gas Identification Officer, Brighton.
- Florence Seager, Manager, Young Men's Christian Association Industrial Hostel, Maeslas, Pencoed.
- Arthur Lennox Armitage Seaman, lately Air Raid Precautions Officer, Billericay and South East Areas.
- Ernest Walter Frank Sear, Honorary Secretary, Watford and District Savings Committee.
- Henry John Vertum Searle, Chief Stores Officer, Joint War Organisation of the British Red Cross Society and Order of St. John.
- George Gordon Seconde, lately Principal Surveyor, Tithe Redemption Commission.
- Harold Lars Segerlind, Chief Engineer Officer, MV Morialte, Adelaide Steamship Company Ltd.
- Phoebe Gladys Senyard, employed in a Department of the Foreign Office.
- John Owen Serjeant, Chief Steward, SS Banfore, Elder Dempster Lines Ltd.
- Major Dudley Overton Seymour, employed in a Department of the Foreign Office.
- Ernest Ralph Seymour, Superintendent, Metropolitan Police.
- Reuben Cyril Shackman, Production Manager, D. Shackman & Sons.
- George Edward Shakeshaft, AMIMechE, Works Superintendent, C.A.V. Ltd.
- Roy Mary Sharpe, lately First Officer, Air Transport Auxiliary.
- Edwin Alfred Sharratt, Manager, Edzell Aircraft Repair Section, Scottish Motor Traction Ltd.
- Captain Daniel Shaw, Master, MV St. Rule, J. & A. Gardner & Company Ltd.
- William Bryan Shaw, lately Flight Captain, Air Transport Auxiliary.
- Christopher Charles Shearcroft, Higher Grade Clerk, British Museum.
- Harold Sheard, MSc, Senior Scientific Officer, Building Research Station, Department of Scientific and Industrial Research.
- George Frank Sheerman, Senior Staff Officer, Ministry of Supply.
- Robert Frederick Shepperd, Senior Staff Officer, Home Office.
- Brigadier Eden Francis Shewell, CMG, DSO, lately Air Raid Precautions Sub-Controller, No. 7 Area and Air Raid Precautions Officer, South Buckinghamshire.
- William Robert Short, Honorary Secretary, County of Fife Savings Committee.
- Harold Shuttleworth, Honorary Secretary, Liverpool Branch, Grenadier Guards Comrades Association.
- Herbert Frederick Sibery, lately Fire Guard Officer, Gloucester.
- Johann Ulrich Signer, Manager, Turbine Shops, Richardsons Westgarth & Company Ltd.
- Edward Allan Simkins, Assistant District Officer, Assistance Board.
- Harold Jerome Simpson, Civilian Clerk, Grade I, War Office, Gibraltar.
- George Norman Duff Sinclair, Deputy Chief Officer, Information and Records Branch, Postal and Telegraph Censorship Department.
- Frances Rose Sinden, Maternity Sister, St. Mary Abbots Hospital, London.
- Arthur George Singleton, Experimental Manager, Briggs Motor Bodies Ltd.
- Valda Nancy Sivyer, Assistant, Board of Trade, recently employed in the Ministry of Production.
- John James Skinner, Second Officer, SS Maywood, J. T. Duncan & Company Ltd.
- Hubert Frederick Sloman, First Class Ministry of Labour and National Service.
- Everard Small, lately Manager, Hanley Deep Pit, Shelton Iron Steel and Coal Company Ltd.
- Lachlan McLean Small, Chief Engineer, Bromborough Margarine Factory, Van den Berghs & Jurgens Ltd.
- Elizabeth Low Smart, Principal, Dominions Office.
- John Russell Smart, Superintendent-in-Charge, Kirkintilloch Division, Dunbartonshire Constabulary.
- George McMillan Smibert, Director and Resident Manager, North Eastern Marine Engineering Company (1938) Ltd.
- Alfred Leslie Smith, Command Supervisor, Eastern Command, Navy, Army and Air Force Institutes.
- Bernard John Smith, Chief Radio Officer, SS Fort Churchill, Thos. & Jno. Brocklebank Ltd.
- Charles St. Vincent Smith, MIMechE, Chief Designing Engineer, Richard Garrett Engineering Works Ltd.
- Charles Tilden Smith, Chief Staff Officer, Ministry of War Transport.
- Cyril Joseph Smith, Director and General Manager, Osmond & Matthews Limited.
- Cyril Leng Smith, PhD, lately Scientific Officer, Telecommunications Research Establishment, Ministry of Aircraft Production.
- Edith Sophia Smith, Honorary Divisional Secretary, Soldiers', Sailors' and Airmens' Families Association, Dartford.
- Colonel Francis Longden Smith, MC, TD, lately Air Raid Precautions Sub-Controller and Chief Warden, Skipton Area, West Riding of Yorkshire.
- Germaine Smith, Joint Controller, Catholic Women's Services Club, Athens.
- Herbert Smith, Honorary Secretary, Buxton Savings Committee.
- Jemima Marna Prest Smith, Soldiers', Sailors' and Airmen's Families Association Nurse in Malta.
- The Honourable Kathleen Whalley Smith, (The Honourable Mrs. Howie), Deputy Director, Civil Defence Workers' Health Department, Joint War Organisation of the British Red Cross Society and Order of St. John.
- Maxwell Smith, MIEE, Chief Equipment Engineer, Ericsson Telephones Ltd.
- Philip Lewis Smith, Senior Executive Officer, HM Treasury.
- Sheila Maude Nicol Smith, lately Senior Assistant, Ministry of Works.
- Captain William Smyth, Master, SS Afon Gwili, William Coombs & Sons Ltd.
- Gordon Snook, Senior Staff Officer, Board of Inland Revenue.
- T/Major Frank Thomas Snow, Civil Assistant, War Office.
- Flora Solomon. For services to Government Departments in connection with welfare work.
- Bridget, Baroness Somerleyton, District Organiser, Women's Voluntary Services. For public services in Lowestoft.
- Catriona Isabel Sopper, Civil Assistant, War Office.
- Daisy Sparks, Assistant County Director, Surrey Branch, British Red Cross Society.
- George Sparshatt, Inspector of Shipping, Officer, War Department Fleet.
- Marjorie Doris Spikes, Regional Welfare Officer, Ministry of Labour and National Service.
- William Reginald Spilman, Assistant Shipyard Manager, John I. Thornycroft & Company Ltd.
- Guy Malcolm Spooner, lately employed in a Department of the Foreign Office.
- Noel Newton Spratt, Higher Executive Office, India Office.
- Squadron Leader Henry Robert James Sprinks, RAFVR, Civil Assistant, Air Ministry.
- Eric Jack Spurrier, Deputy Victualling Store Officer, Admiralty.
- John Stacey, Staff Officer, Ministry of National Insurance.
- Major William Edward Stacey, Administrative Welfare Officer, Anti-Aircraft Command.
- John Andrew Stafford, Establishment Officer, Royal Electrical and Mechanical Engineers Record Office, Northern Command, War Office.
- Donald Victor Staines, Senior Establishment and Accounts Officer, Foreign Office.
- Captain Frederick Lionel Stark, Master, SS Francunion, Shell Mex & B.P. Ltd.
- Captain James Arthur Stark, Master, SS Petworth, Stephenson Clarke Ltd.
- Captain Edward Skelton Stauffer, Master, SS Empire Phyllis, Townsend Bros.
- Captain Gerald Anthony Stedall, Second in Command, No. 1 Ferry Pool, Air Transport Auxiliary.
- George Herbert Stephenson, Assistant Controller, Postal and Telegraph Censorship Department.
- Frederick George Stevens, Staff Officer, Ministry of Agriculture and Fisheries.
- Wilfred Stocks, Works Manager, Steetley Company Ltd.
- Frederick Joseph Stokes, Naval Armament Supply Officer, Admiralty.
- Alfred Bentley Stott, Works Manager and Director, Dawson, Payne & Elliott Ltd.
- Lorna Beatrice Stowe, Staff Officer, Grade I, Detachment Department, British Red Cross Society
- George Strickland, Cable Foreman, SS Marie Louise Mackay, Commercial Cable Company.
- Richard Metcalfe Strowger, Dredging Instructor to the War Office.
- Captain Thomas Moore Stuart, Governor, HM Prison, Belfast.
- Frank Norman Stubbs, lately Chief Technical Assistant, Ministry of Production.
- Rebecca Sugden, Founder, Ellison Clinic for Crippled Children, Spenborough.
- John Rhys Sully, Technical Officer, Ministry of Labour and National Service.
- John Roxby Surtees. For public services in County Durham.
- Gwendoline Iris Swan, Secretary and Manager, Overseas Appeal Section, Joint War Organisation of the British Red Cross Society and Order of St. John.
- May Drusilla Elizabeth Swan, lately Regional Woman Fire Officer, No. 12 (South-Eastern) Regional Fire Headquarters, National Fire Service.
- John Harold Tabor, Senior Staff Officer, Ministry of Agriculture and Fisheries.
- Hilda Margaret Tapley, Centre Organiser, Ilford, Women's Voluntary Services. For services to Civil Defence.
- Ralph Charles Tarlton, lately Air Raid Precautions Officer, Borough of Finsbury.
- Thomas Henry Edward Tarrant, Higher Clerical Officer, Judge Advocate-General's Office, War Office.
- Frederick William Taster, Chief Steward, SS Stratheden, Peninsular & Oriental Steam Navigation Company.
- William Tatnall, Lieutenant-Colonel, Salvation Army, Secretary, Salvation Army Naval, Military and Air Force League.
- Edith Gwendolen Tattersall, JP, Chairman, Women's Sub-Committee, Blackburn Employment Committee.
- Alec Taylor, Organiser and Manager, Church Army Canteens. For service to the Royal Air Force.
- Catherine Margaret Taylor, Deputy County Organiser and County Clothing Officer, Northumberland, Women's Voluntary Services. For services to Civil Defence.
- David Latto Taylor, Senior Assistant Repair Manager, Caledon Shipbuilding and Engineering Company Ltd.
- Elizabeth Mitchell Taylor, Staff Officer, Scottish Home Department.
- Ethel Sunderland Taylor, County Secretary for East Suffolk, Women's Land Army.
- Isabelle Cassells Marr Taylor, Civil Assistant, War Office.
- Mary Evelyn MacDonald-Taylor, Member, Schools Advisory Subcommittee, National Savings Committee.
- Megan Pryce Taylor, Food Executive Officer, Ministry of Food.
- Captain John Templeton, Master, SS Clydebrae, Hugh Craig & Company Ltd.
- Alexander Thain, Chairman, Civil Defence Services Welfare Council, Edinburgh.
- Arthur Thomas, Chief Research and Development Engineer, Power Accounting Machines Ltd.
- Arthur Haydn Thomas, Works Superintendent, Hoover Ltd.
- Ivor Hornsley Thomas, Assistant Regional Controller, Wales Region, Ministry of Labour and National Service.
- William Oswald Thomas, District House Coal Officer, Anglesey.
- Dorothy Thompson, Personal Secretary to Chairman, Railway Executive Committee, Great Western Railway Company.
- Sybil Mary Ryland Thompson, County Borough Organiser, York, Women's Voluntary Services. For services to Civil Defence.
- William Henry Joseph Thompson, Assistant Fire Force Commander No. 37 (London) Fire Force, National Fire Service.
- Alfred John Thorogood, Clerk, Territorial Army and Air Force Association, Devon.
- Herbert George Thurston, lately Staff Officer to Air Raid Precautions Controller, and Borough Sub-Controller, Wandsworth.
- William Edward Tickner, Head of Branch, Tithe Redemption Commission.
- Norman Atkinson Tinkler, Staff Officer, HM Treasury.
- Denis George Tobin, Senior Technical Officer, Ministry of Aircraft Production.
- Harold William Tombs, AMIMechE, Engineer, Anglo-Iranian Oil Company Ltd. For services to the Petroleum Warfare Department.
- Captain Arnold Tomlinson, Master, ST Atigny, Padder & Mylchreest.
- Janet Katherine Tompkins, Honorary Organising Secretary, Lady Mayoress of Birmingham's Comforts Fund.
- Alfred Toms, employed in a Department of the Foreign Office.
- Grace Dorothy Mary Torrington, Local Army Welfare Officer, Western Command.
- Herbert George Toseland, Senior Executive Officer, Ministry of Supply.
- Albert Edward Towle, Works Superintendent, E. W. Bliss (England) Ltd.
- Captain Robert Wilfred Townsend, MC, Commandant, Exeter City Special Constabulary.
- Agnes Amy Travis, Headmistress, Grookhey Hall Special School, Cockerham, Liverpool.
- Lewis Edward Trevers, BEM, Director, National Civil Defence Rescue School, Sutton Coldfield, Birmingham.
- Mary Eleanor Trood, Voluntary Organiser of Richmond (Yorks) Parish Church Services Club.
- George Henry Trueman, Senior Staff Officer, Ministry of Information.
- Hilda Irene Tucker, Shorthand-Typist, Air Ministry, now serving in the Control Office for Germany and Austria.
- Maurice Denison Tungate, Deputy Food Executive Officer, Ministry of Food.
- Edith Ramage Stewart Turnbull, Area Officer, Western (No. 1) Area of Scotland, National Fire Service.
- Thomas Tushingham, Chief Steward, SS Staffordshire, Bibby Line.
- Norman Answorth Twemlow, lately Industrial Adviser, Radio Production Executive.
- Albert Arthur Twiddy, Deputy Director of Machine Tools, Ministry of Aircraft Production.
- Percival Edward Tyhurst, Divisional Warden, Civil Defence Wardens Service, Bristol.
- Colston John Vear, Senior Crafts Organiser, Tyneside Council of Social Services, Newcastle upon Tyne. For services to Civil Defence.
- The Reverend Canon Harry George Veazey, Vicar of St. Mark's Church, Camberwell. For services to Civil Defence.
- William Charles Vidler, Representative, Prisoners of War Department, Marseilles, Joint War Organisation of the British Red Cross Society and Order of St. John.
- Maurice William Viney, Higher Executive Officer, Ministry of National Insurance.
- Herbert John Wakeford, lately Clerk, Grade III, War Office.
- Reginald Eric Walker, Owner of the Excelsior Motor Company Ltd.
- Cyril Wallace, Second Engineer Officer, SS King George V, David Macbrayne Ltd.
- Kathleen Margaret Wallace, Clerical Officer, Offices of the Cabinet and Minister of Defence.
- Claude Edgar Wallis, Managing Director of the Associated Iliffe Press. For services to the Joint War Organisation of the British Red Cross Society and Order of St. John.
- Arnold Robert Walmsley, employed in a Department of the Foreign Office.
- Leonard Victor Walter, Higher Clerical Officer, Offices of the Cabinet and Minister of Defence.
- William James Walters, Higher Clerical Officer, Offices of the Cabinet and Minister of Defence.
- Thomas Walton, lately Chief Warden, Civil Defence Wardens Service, Derby.
- William Henry Warman, Works Manager, Rediffusion Ltd.
- Wing-Commander Raymond Curteis Warren, ARAeS, Principal Inspector of Accidents, Air Ministry.
- Stanley Howard Warren, Assistant Engineer Inspector, Admiralty.
- George Warrington, Unit Controller, Road Haulage Organisation, Sheffield.
- Charles Oliver Waterhouse, Technical Assistant First Class, Foreign Office, recently employed in the Ministry of Economic Warfare.
- Frederick James Waters, Staff Officer, Ministry of Aircraft Production.
- Aubrey Watson, Senior Accountant, Ministry of Aircraft Production.
- John Frederick Watson, Staff Officer, Air Ministry.
- Thomas Watson, Chief Billeting Officer and Clerk to the Windermere Urban District Council.
- Edward Thomas Watts, Examiner of Gunnery Control Work, Admiralty.
- Kenneth Arthur Watts, Works Manager, London Spinning Company Ltd.
- Observer Lieutenant James Lister Waugh, Royal Observer Corps.
- Christopher Frederick Webb, Chief Designer, Bell Punch Company Ltd.
- John Webb, Chairman, North West Regional Council, National Association of Spotters Clubs.
- Wesley Ernest Weir, Chief Billeting Officer, Preston County Borough.
- Edmund John Welch, Senior Warning Officer, Royal Observer Corps Centre, Eastern Civil Defence Region.
- Eric Gylby Welch, Manager of Tube Mills, James Booth & Company Ltd.
- Norman Welch, Assistant Shipyard Manager, Swan Hunter & Wigham Richardson Ltd.
- Herbert George Wells, Senior Staff Officer, Air Ministry.
- Joseph Wells, Staff Officer, Air Ministry.
- Joseph Raymond Wells, Chairman, Joseph Wells & Sons Ltd.
- Stella Wyndham Colchester-Wemyss, County Organiser, Gloucestershire, Women's Voluntary Services. For Army welfare work.
- Norman Henry West, Higher Clerical Officer, Offices of the Cabinet and Minister of Defence.
- Margaret Alice Wheeler, Honorary Secretary, Charlton and Blackheath Branch, Incorporated Soldiers', Sailors' and Airmen's Help Society.
- Mary Hilda Whitaker, Supervisor of Emergency Maternity Homes in Blackpool.
- Albert Ernest White, Managing Director, Diamond Development Company Ltd.
- George Johnson White, Senior Establishment and Accounts Officer, Foreign Office.
- Edward Daniel Whitehead, AMIEE, Technical Superintendent of Radio Components, Inter-Service Components Technical Committee.
- Joseph Whiteside, Assistant Eire Force Commander No. 27 (Manchester) Fire Force, National Fire Service.
- Fred Ernest Whitfield, Commandant, Great Yarmouth Special Constabulary.
- Judith Vivien Whitfield, employed in a Department of the Foreign Office.
- Councillor Richard Alfred Wickens, MM, JP, lately Air Raid Precautions Controller, Newbury.
- Victor Frederick Wilkins, Staff Officer, Board of Inland Revenue.
- George Frederick Wilkinson, Senior Production Officer, Ministry of Aircraft Production.
- Thomas Alfred Wilkinson, Works Manager and Chief Engineer, Lancashire Steel Corporation Ltd.
- Donovan Williams, Senior Staff Officer, Board of Inland Revenue.
- Jack Williams, Administrative Officer, Grade II, Foreign Office, recently employed in the Ministry of Economic Warfare.
- James Hamilton Williams, Assistant Finance Officer, Middle East Ministry of Information.
- Minnie Carr Williams, Assistant District Officer, Assistance Board.
- William Arthur Williams, Staff Officer, Scottish Education Department.
- Leonard James Williamson, Staff Officer, War Office.
- Phyllis Marguerite Williamson, Superintendent of Typists, Petroleum Warfare Department.
- John Willis, Principal Partner and Manager, John Willis & Son.
- Captain Ernest Wilson, Master, MV Sandhill, Tyne-Tees Steam Shipping Company Ltd.
- Henry Moir Wilson, PhD, AMIMechE, AFRAeS, Education Officer, Grade II, Air Ministry.
- Kenneth John Wilson, Regional Commissioner for National Savings, National Savings Committee.
- Percy James Wilson, Superintendent, Head Post Office, King's Lynn, Norfolk.
- Walter Wilson, Assistant, Grade I, National Physical Laboratory.
- Observer Commander William John Wilson, Royal Observer Corps.
- Kenneth Mark Winch, FRIBA, Honorary Architect to the Incorporated Soldiers' Sailors' and Airmen's Help Society.
- Albert Wingett, Assistant Postmaster, Head Post Office, Plymouth.
- Thomas Reginald Winning, Chief Billeting Officer, Reading County Borough.
- Thomas Winsper, Works Manager, J. A. Phillips & Company Ltd.
- Thomas Winter, Mill Manager, Bromford Works, Stewarts and Lloyds, Ltd.
- Carl Albert Antoine Wolff, Senior Executive Officer, Ministry of National Insurance.
- Jesse Wombwell, Works Manager, Imperial Typewriter Company, Ltd.
- Ewart Nelson Woodhouse, Managing Director, Woodhouse Brothers (Cradley Heath) Ltd.
- Captain Harry Walter Woods, AFM, in command of Thame Flying Training School, Air Transport Auxiliary.
- George Woodvine, Managing Director, Sentinels (Shrewsbury) Ltd.
- Hedley Royle Wooler, Works Agent, Air Transport Auxiliary.
- Elsie Frances Wormington, Executive Officer, Home Office.
- Harry Vernon Worrall, DSC, Senior Test Pilot, A. V. Roe & Company Ltd.
- Captain James Wood Wotherspoon, Master, SS Empire Shelter, City Line Ltd.
- Herbert Arthur James Wrigglesworth, Stores Manager, St. John Ambulance Association.
- Arthur Wright, for public services in Pengam, Glamorganshire.
- Edward Stainsby Wright, Assistant Engineer, Quartz Crystal Development, S.T. & C. Ltd.
- George Wroe, Assistant Inspector of Naval Ordnance, Adndralty.
- George William Yates, Works Manager, Barry Graving Dock & Engineering Company Ltd.
- Allan Yeaman, District Goods and Passenger Manager, Inverness, London, Midland and Scottish Railway Company.
- Harry Godfrey Yeatman, Chief Inspector, General Post Office.
- Frederick Yelf, lately Sub-Controller and Air Raid Precautions Officer, Sandown-Shanklin District.
- Gwen Yorath, Commandant, London County Council Wartime Residential Nursery School. For services to Civil Defence.
- George Cuthbert Young, Chief Engineer, KLM Royal Dutch Airlines.
- Joseph William Young, Senior Staff Officer, Ministry of Fuel and Power.
- Victor Leslie Young, Manager, Enfield Cycle Company, Ltd.
- Eileen Younghusband, JP, Tutor in Social Science, London School of Economics and Political Science.
- Alfred James Thomas Allen, Assistant Archivist at His Majesty's Embassy at Bagdad.
- Major John Henry Anderson, British subject resident in Iceland.
- Charles Henry Arden, Assistant in Relief Department of Consular Section, British Embassy, Paris.
- Edmund Roland Candler Beard, British subject resident in Mexico.
- Olga Blanche Benitz, British subject resident in the Argentine Republic.
- George Oholerton Bowker, British Vice-Consul at Bone.
- George Richmond Broadbent, British subject resident in Egypt.
- Charles Percival Brown, British subject resident in Chile.
- Edward Cecil Butler, British subject resident in Chile.
- Anthony Carter, British subject resident in Egypt.
- Sybil Corbett, formerly Camp Leader of Civilian internment Camp at Vittel.
- James Edward Cunningham, British subject resident in Portugal.
- Margaret Elizabeth Evan Davies, British subject resident in Spain.
- William George Dobson, Higher Clerical Officer, on the staff of the British Political Representative, Bucharest.
- William Crawford Duncan, formerly Camp Leader of Civilian Internment Camp at Kreuzberg.
- Cecil Francis Fladgate, Head Archivist at the British Embassy at Buenos Aires.
- Wing Commander Donald Hayton Fleet, Assistant Air Attaché at the British Embassy at Stockholm.
- Leonard Arthur Frenken, attached to a Department of the Foreign Office, for service abroad.
- Garnet Garfield Garland, formerly Camp Leader of Civilian Internment Camp at Biberach.
- Alan Beresford Silver Gloyne, Press Attaché and British Vice-Consul at Asuncion.
- Doris Ward Hall, British subject resident in the Argentine Republic.
- Winifred Harle, British subject resident in France.
- Margaret Eleanor Herrington, British Information Services, New York.
- Matthew Bede Hicks, British subject resident in Persia.
- William Hillier, Assistant Commercial Secretary at the British Embassy at Athens.
- Arthur Hirst, MC, Executive Engineer, Telegraphs and Telephones, Sudan.
- Albert Henry House, Head Staff Clerk, Civil Secretary's Department, Sudan.
- Frank Harcourt Johnson, British subject resident in Persia.
- William Johnson, Clerk at His Majesty's Consulate-General, Tangier.
- Alexander McKibbin, attached to a Department of the Foreign Office, for service abroad.
- John Ritchie Macpherson, British Vice-Consul at Mobile.
- John Wood Massey, His Majesty's Consul at Iquitos.
- Clara Mooney, British subject resident in Norway.
- Alexander Murray, British Vice-Consul at San Jose.
- William Frederick Oram, Clerical Officer to Military Attaché, British Embassy, Washington.
- Tessie O'Carroll, Registry Assistant, British Embassy, Rio de Janeiro.
- Socrates Joannou Patsalides, Higher Grade Clerk, Royal Air Force Headquarters, Middle East.
- Jean Sawyer Rankin, British subject resident in Yugoslavia.
- Alexander Walter Sleator, attached to a Department of the Foreign Office, for service abroad.
- Frederick Charles Stanton, British subject resident in Bolivia.
- Ruth Noreen Siebert, Private Secretary to His Majesty's Consul-General at Detroit.
- Agnes Taylor, Private Secretary to His Majesty's Consul-General at New York.
- Emrys Cadwalader Thomas, British subject resident in the Lebanon.
- William Macrae Watson, British subject resident in Persia.
- Horace White, Employed in the British Embassy at Moscow.
- Alice Kathleen Wright, British subject resident in Sweden.
- Ronald William Mein Atkin. For voluntary work in connection with the Dominion and Allied Services Hospitality Scheme.
- Margaret Ellen Barham, a member of the Bulawayo City Council, Southern Rhodesia. For social welfare work, especially with the coloured community.
- Myra Maud Bennett, a District Nurse in Newfoundland for many years.
- Alice Muir Bowie, Principal of the Paris Evangelical Missionary Society Training School, Thabana Morena, Basutoland.
- Janet Muir Boyce, of Swaziland. For services in connection with the Queen Mother's Comforts Fund for African Pioneer Corps men.
- Dorothy Adah Barr Brown. For services in connection with the work of the Empire Societies' War Hospitality Club, Grosvenor Street, London.
- Marjory Crichton Jamieson Campbell, Commandant of the South African Women's Auxiliary Services unit at Havelock Mine, Swaziland.
- Robert Louis Ciring, a Trader of Lobatsi and, for many years, a member of the European Advisory Council, Bechuanaland Protectorate.
- Martha Blomfield Clarke. For devoted service over a long period to blind persons in the State of Tasmania.
- Olive Hilary Cooke. For services in connection with the work of the Victoria League Hospitality Bureau.
- Frances Mary Cowell. For services in connection with the work of the Empire Rendezvous and Hostel, Portsmouth, under the auspices of the Empire Societies' War Hospitality Committee.
- Irene Mabel Napier Cree, Lady Director of the King George and Queen Elizabeth Officers' Club, Edinburgh, under the auspices of the Empire Societies' War Hospitality Committee.
- Richard Joseph Crummey, Officer-in-charge of the operations of the Newfoundland Savings Bank during the War.
- Jane Helena Daly, formerly Matron of the Bulawayo Hospital, and now in charge of the Native Clinic at Ndanga, Southern Rhodesia.
- Hilda Winifred Davis. For services in connection with patriotic and charitable movements in the State of South Australia.
- Gladys Jean Dean. For services in connection with patriotic and charitable organisations in the State of South Australia.
- Willem Hendrik Dippenaar, Principal of Goedgegun European School, Swaziland.
- Anne Douglas. For services in connection with the work of the Enquiry Bureau, Empire Societies' War Hospitality Committee, London.
- Captain William Dowden Edwards. For services to Civil Defence, Newfoundland.
- Michael Joseph Evans, Senior Preventive Officer, Department of Customs, Newfoundland.
- Robert Fleming, Clerk and Overseer, Streaky Bay District Council, State of South Australia.
- Arthur Fletcher, Honorary Secretary, Cheer-Up Society, State of South Australia.
- Mary Claudine Stirling, Lady Fraser. For voluntary work in connection with the Dominion and Allied Services Hospitality Scheme.
- Erris Heather Fullerton. For services in connection with the work of the Rendezvous and Enquiry Bureau, Empire Societies' War Hospitality Committee, London.
- Hubert Evelyn Going. For public services in the Bechuanaland Protectorate.
- Joanna Lang Gosse, a prominent worker for the Red Cross in the State of South Australia.
- Laura Elizabeth Hansell, Secretary, Empire Societies' War Hospitality Committee.
- Lorna Hughes, Honorary Deputy Organiser, Cheer-Up Hut, Adelaide, State of South Australia.
- Alfred James Ivany, Assistant Secretary, Department of Posts and Telegraphs, Newfoundland.
- Peter Kent. For services to Civil Defence, Newfoundland.
- Minnie Margaret Fraser King. For work in connection with the South African Women's Auxiliary Services in the Southern District of Swaziland.
- Maud Agg-Large, Missioner of the South African Church Railway Mission. For social welfare work among Railway employees in Southern Rhodesia.
- Myrtle Carletta Lawrie, Honorary Secretary, Allied Forces Welfare Bureau, State of South Australia.
- Esther Lipman, a prominent worker for charitable and patriotic movements in the State of South Australia.
- Henry Darroch MacGillivray. For services to Civil Defence, Newfoundland.
- Neil MacLellan, Officer-in-charge of the Forestry Division, Department of Natural Resources, Newfoundland.
- Florence Mary Mann. For services in connection with the work of the Empire Societies' War Hospitality Club, Exeter.
- Harry Bernhard Masterson, Assistant Native Commissioner, Native Affairs Department, Southern Rhodesia.
- John Wallace McIlraith, Mechanical Superintendent, Bechuanaland Protectorate.
- Dorothea Mavis McLeod. For services to the Schools Patriotic Fund, State of South Australia.
- Elva Edith Morison, Honorary Country Organiser, Cheer-Up Society, State of South Australia.
- Mary Mackenzie Munro, Matron of the Lady Chancellor Nursing Home, Southern Rhodesia.
- Bertha Jane Osmond, of Bulawayo, Southern Rhodesia. For social welfare work for the troops, especially those with the Rhodesian Air Training Group.
- Alfred James Palmer, Provincial Adjutant, Memorable Order of Tin Hats, an ex-servicemen's organisation in Southern Rhodesia.
- Frederick Ivor Parnell, Assistant District Officer, Basutoland.
- Elsie Mary Perry. For services to the Catholic Schools Patriotic Fund, State of South Australia.
- Alice Mary Inman Pigott, Matron, Medical Department, Maseru, Basutoland.
- Captain Jacobus Johannes Prinsloo, Commandant, Southern District Rifle Association, Swaziland.
- Margaret O'Neill Quinlan, a Nurse on the staff of the Department of Public Health and Welfare, Newfoundland.
- Francis Edward Reynolds, Assistant Secretary of the South Australian Branch, Returned Sailors, Soldiers, and Airmen's Imperial League of Australia.
- Ludwig Charles Rust, a Trader at Phamong in the Mohale's Hoek District, Basutoland. For public and philanthropic services during the War.
- Gertrude Julia Shalovsky, of Salisbury, Southern Rhodesia. For services rendered in connection with Troops' Canteens.
- Violet Shepherd. For honorary services as Supervisor of Units in the State of South Australia of the Fighting Forces Comforts Fund.
- Annie Ethel Simonett, a prominent worker for the Red Cross in the State of South Australia.
- Edith Annie Stewart, Commandant of the British Red Cross in Swaziland.
- George Errington Story. For services to Civil Defence, Newfoundland.
- Caroline Maud Symonds, President of the South Australian Branch, Royal Naval Friendly Union of Sailors' Wives and Mothers.
- David Rudolph Thistle. For services to Civil Defence, Newfoundland.
- Winnifred Ina Tunmer, of Gwelo, Southern Rhodesia. For social welfare work for the troops, especially those with the Rhodesian Air Training Group.
- Edith Maria Turner. For services to institutions concerned with social welfare in Bulawayo, Southern Rhodesia.
- Gladys Van Rensburg, of Mafeteng, Basutoland, Honorary Secretary, Mafeteng Branch of the Victoria League, throughout the. War.
- Elsie Dorothy Verco. For services in the State of South Australia as Controller of the Wool Depot, Fighting Forces Comforts Fund.
- Elizabeth Hornabrook Wilson. For services in connection with charitable and patriotic movements in the State of South Australia.
- Phyllis Gertrude Wilson, Matron, Athlone Hospital, Lobatsi, Bechuanaland Protectorate.
- Joyce Mavis Lilian Yeats, of Teyate-yaneng, Basutoland. For public and social welfare services.
- Wynne Butler, Chairman, Indian Red Cross Women's Council, Bombay.
- Mabel Button, Liaison Officer, Polish Refugee Camp, Kolhapur.
- Rosemary Margaret Meredydd Clee, Deputy Assistant Censor, Karachi.
- Barbara Ethel Cox, Deputy Assistant Censor, Belgaum.
- Razia Faruqui, Welfare Officer, No. 17 Area, Middle East Forces.
- Gwynedd May Halsall, WVS, Joint Honorary Secretary of the Hospital Committee, Bombay.
- Effie May Holmes, Deputy Directress of Public Instruction, Central Provinces and Berar.
- Jean Susan Somervell Hunter, WVS, Joint Honorary Secretary of the Hospital Committee, Bombay.
- Evelyn Lord, for welfare work in Sind.
- Louise Lyall, Matron, Cadets Hospital, Indian Military Academy, Dehra Dun.
- Marjorie Phyllis Rainbow, Superintendent of Typists, India Store Department, Office of the High Commissioner for India, London.
- Phoebe Read. For public services in Madras.
- Rosemary Celestine Southorn. For services to the Joint War Charities Supply Depot, Madras.
- Dorothy Stanier, Lady District Superintendent, Auxiliary Nursing Service, St. John Ambulance Brigade Overseas (District No. 3), Bombay.
- Joan Syrett, Deputy Assistant Censor, Calcutta.
- Eardley Henrietta Wildman, Shorthand-typist and Assistant to the Private Secretary, Office of the High Commissioner for India, London.
- Abdul Hamid, officiating Director of Telegraphs, and lately Divisional Engineer, Telegraphs, Lahore.
- Chaudhri Abdul Rahim, lately Member, Punjab Legislative Assembly, Landlord, Village Bandholi, Tahsil Firozepore-Jhirka, Gurgaon District, Punjab.
- Captain Abdur Rahman Pesh Iman, IAMC, Indian Medical Service, attached to No. 21 I.B.G.H. (I.T.) and lately Sub-Divisional Health Officer, Feni, Bengal.
- Bhaskar Namdeo Adarkar, officiating Deputy Economic Adviser to the Government of India.
- Prem Mahesh Agerwala, Divisional Engineer, Telegraphs, Construction Branch of Posts and Telegraphs Directorate, New Delhi.
- James Aitken, Director of River Transport, Transportation HQ, Calcutta.
- Amiruddin Ahmad, Deputy Legal Remembrancer, Bengal.
- Rai Bahadur Bipulendra Nath Banerjee, Chairman, District Board, Jalpaiguri, Bengal.
- Barkatullah Khan, Goods Superintendent, Bombay, Baroda & Central India Railway, Bombay.
- George Thomas Beer, Inspector-General of Police, Bundi State.
- Mirza Inayat Ullah Beg, Retired Deputy Superintendent of Police, District Commander, Civic Guard, Gujrat, Punjab.
- Lieutenant-Colonel William Bell, Electrical Engineer to the City Board, Mussoorie, United Provinces.
- Honorary Captain Sardar Bahadur Bhikam Singh, MC, OBI, IDSM, Sarbrah Zaildar, Village Jarot, Tahsil Dehra, Kangra District, Punjab.
- Captain Nusserwanji Pirozshah Billimoeia, Honorary Ophthalmic Surgeon, Indian Military General Hospital, Bombay.
- Arthur Reginald Brand, Assistant Conservator of Forests, Madras.
- Avitus Carneiro, officiating Under-secretary to Government, Central Provinces and Berar.
- Kumud Ranjan Chaudhuri, Indian Police, Special Superintendent of Police, i/c Criminal Investigation Department, Assam.
- John Collins, Manager, Jamirah Tea Estate, Dibrugarh, Assam.
- Arnold Lionel Cooke, Chief Cost Accounts Officer, Finance Department (Supply), Munitions Production Branch.
- Clarence Oswald Coorey, Indian Civil Service, Deputy Secretary to the Government of Madras, Education and Public Health Department.
- Albert Joseph Courtney, Assistant Director, Military Regulations and Forms, Defence Department, Government of India.
- Eric Graham Cullen, District Engineer, Madras & Southern Mahratta Railway, on Special Duty (Major D. of I. Corps).
- Clarence Vivian Cunningham, Assistant Director-General (Establishments A), Posts and Telegraphs Directorate, New Delhi.
- Narendra Nath Das, Divisional Forest Officer, Cachar, Silchar, Assam.
- Richard Oswald Davidson, Chairman, Titagarh Municipality, 24 Parganas District, Bengal.
- Thomas Valentine Dent, Indian Forest Service, Divisional Forest Officer, Chittagong, Bengal.
- Mark Christopher Drew, Manager, Bombay Salvage Depot (Lieutenant RIAC, Retd).
- Patrick Dwyer, Officer Supervisor, Air Headquarters, India.
- Lieutenant-Colonel Thomas Riley Ebsworth, IAOC, Controller of Clothing, United Provinces Circle.
- Hubert Crayden Edmunds, Medical Missionary, Hiranpur, Santal Parganas District, Bihar.
- Richard Vincent Fenton, Indian Civil Service, Officiating Deputy Secretary to the Government of India in the Industries and Supplies Department.
- Denis Archibald Ferguson, officiating Head Engineer, His Majesty's Mint, Bombay.
- Captain Eric Aubrey Fern, Commandant, Internment Camp and Parole Centre, Satara.
- Walter Anthony Fosberry, District Mechanical Engineer, Bengal & Assam Railway, Lumding.
- Saiyad Muhammad Abdul Ialil Shah Gardezi, Landlord, Honorary Magistrate, Multan, Punjab.
- Mool Raj Ghulati, Deputy Regional Food Commissioner, N.W. Region.
- Captain Narain Shandas Gidwani, RIASC, Deputy Director of Purchase, Department of Food, Government of India.
- Harold Peter Goodwyn, India Civil Service, Deputy Secretary to His Excellency the Governor of Bengal.
- Irvine Conrad Gray, Executive Officer, Secunderabad.
- Paresh Chandra Guha, AMS, LMS, DTM, Civil Surgeon (Retd.), Assam.
- Ali Bahadur Habibullah, Director of Defence Purchases of Cotton Textiles in the Office of the Textile Commissioner.
- Prakash Narain Haksar, Tyre Rationing Officer (Rubber Control), Directorate-General of Supply, Government of India.
- William Alexander Halls, ENSA Artiste.
- Wilfred Charles Hancock, Inspector of Stores, India Store Department, Office of the High Commissioner for Indian, London.
- Walter Leonard Harrison, Assistant Secretary, Office of the Private Secretary to His Excellency the Viceroy.
- Arthur Heath, Senior Assistant Commercial Manager, North-Western Railway, Lahore.
- Captain Ney Lindsay Hervey, Superintendent of the Chapra Labour Depot, Chapra, Bihar.
- Walter Hogg (Retired Chief Engineer, Messrs. A. & F. Harvey & Co., Madura), Bangalore.
- James Findlay Hosie, Indian Civil Service, lately Magistrate and Collector, Shahabad, Bihar.
- Malik Muhammad Iqbal, Landlord, Honorary Magistrate, Kunda, Attock District, Punjab.
- Lakshmi Kant Jha, Indian Civil Service, Officiating Deputy Secretary to the Government of India (Munitions Production Secretariat), Department of Supply.
- Jhunna Singh, India Forest Service, Deputy Conservator of Forests, Lahore, Punjab.
- Charles Edward Jolly, Technical Officer, Ordnance Factories Division, Department of Supply, Government of India, Calcutta.
- Henry Alexander Jones, Commandant, Bengal Civil Pioneer Force and lately O.C, 2nd Bn. Bengal Civil Pioneer Force.
- Saroj Kumar Kanjilal, Divisional Engineer, Telegraphs, Construction Branch of Posts and Telegraphs Directorate, New Delhi.
- Hemandas Khanchand Kewalramani, Executive Engineer, Baluchistan Irrigation Department.
- Khan Bahadur Abdul Qaiyum Ahmad Khan, Inspector-General of Police, Khairpur State.
- Qazi Muhammad Aslam Khan, Advocate, Peshawar, North-West Frontier Province.
- Kundan Lal Khanna, Principal, V.B. College, Dera Ismail Khan, North-West Frontier Province.
- Jalota Omkar Lal, Director, Liaison and Woollens Directorate, Industries and Civil Supplies Department, Government of India.
- Major Alexander Lamb, Planning Officer (Wireless), Railway Board, New Delhi.
- Hugh Thompson Lane, Indian Civil Service, Regional Food Controller, Meerut, United Provinces.
- Arthur Llewellyn-Smith, lately Joint Chief Adviser, A.R.P. (Factory), Labour Department, Government of India.
- Clayton Wilfred Longman, Under Secretary to the Government of India in the Department of Supply (Main Secretariat).
- James Walter Main, Manager, Cawnpore Sugar Works, Limited, Gauribazar, Gorakhpur District, United Provinces.
- John Augustine Manawwar, Chief Marketing Officer, Animal Husbandry Department, United Provinces.
- Honorary Second Lieutenant Rao Sahib Mohanlal Chimanlal Maniar, Honorary Assistant Technical Recruiting Officer, Contractor, Poona, Bombay.
- Rai Sahib Pandit Man Mohan Nath, Superintendent, Borstal Institution and Juvenile Jail and Women's Jail, Lahore, Punjab.
- Stanislaus Raphael Mendonsa, Deputy Assistant Field Controller, Military Accounts.
- Eric Atkinson Midgley, Indian Civil Service, Deputy Secretary to Government, Rationing Department, United Provinces.
- Sardar Sheriar Burjorji Modi, Landlord, Surat, Bombay.
- James Frederick Morse, Canning Expert, North-West Frontier Province.
- Walter Edward Morton, Assistant Financial Adviser, Military Finance, Government of India.
- Chakravarthi Vijiaraghava Narasimhan, Indian Civil Service, Deputy Secretary to the Government of Madras, Development Department.
- Syed Nasrat Ali, Assistant Deputy Director-General, Staff, Posts and Telegraph Directorate, New Delhi.
- Ronald Carlton Vivian Piadade Noronha, Indian Civil Sendee, Deputy Director of Food Supplies, Central Provinces and Berar.
- Anant Krishnaji Nulkar, Civil Medical Practitioner, Indian Military Hospital, Poona.
- Patrick Aloysius O'Brien, Confidential Assistant to His Excellency the Governor of the North-West Frontier Province.
- Cecil Harold Ottley-Vears, Assistant Transportation Superintendent, Great Indian Peninsula Railway, Bombay.
- Jack Shame Page, Technical Assistant, Oriental Gas Company, Calcutta, Bengal.
- Chananand Pande, Executive Engineer, East Indian Railway, Bareilly.
- Jack Wilmshurst Parslow, Honorary Secretary and Treasurer, St. Dunstan's Section of the Resident's War Purposes Fund, Secunderabad (Deccan).
- Nemam Echambadi Srinivasa Raghavachari, Indian Civil Service, Under Secretary to the Government of Madras, Public Works Department.
- Doddi Bhima Rao, lately Principal Postal Adviser, and Assistant Chief Postal Censor, General Headquarters, India.
- Pamadi Raghavandrarao Krishna Rao, Meteorological Liaison Officer, attached to Air Headquarters, New Delhi.
- Chinmoy Kumar Ray, Officer on Special Duty, Commerce Department, Government of India.
- Thomas Edward Rogers, Manager, Amluckie Tea Estate, Salona, Nowgong, Assam.
- Binay Bhusan Roy, Electrical Engineer and Electric Inspector to the Government of Orissa.
- Paul Dhanraj Runganadhan, Officer-in-Charge, Indian Seamen's Welfare Section, India House, London (lately Manager, Bevin Trainees).
- Salimuzzaman Siddiqui, Acting Director, Council of Scientific and Industrial Research, Delhi.
- Lalchand Jhamrai Sajnani, Assistant Director-General (Planning), Posts and Telegraphs Directorate, New Delhi.
- Ernest Edward Salisbury, Assistant Inspector of Guns, Hyderabad (Deccan).
- Edward George Salter, lately Chief Labour Recruiting Officer, Travancore State.
- John Frederick Saunders, Indian Civil Service, Secretary to the Commissioner of Civil Supplies, Board of Revenue, Madras.
- Mohan Dnyneshwar Shahane, Information Officer and Special Press Adviser to Government, Central Provinces and Berar.
- Henry John Shailes, Deputy Regional Controller of Railway Priorities, Calcutta (West).
- Rai Sahib Ram Asis Singh, Deputy Superintendent of Police (Retd.), Superintendent of Sub-Jail, Arrah, Bihar.
- James Alexander Powel Smith, Officiating Inspector, Preventive Service, Custom House, Calcutta.
- Rai Bahadur Ram Swarup Srivastava, Civil Surgeon (Retd.), Dehra Dun, United Provinces.
- Frank Robert Steele, Local Forwarding Agent, Tea Districts Labour Association, Berhampur, Ganjam, Orissa.
- Donald Gordon Stewart, Acting Executive Officer, Office of the High Commissioner for India, London.
- Thirumalraya Swaminathan, Indian Civil Service, Deputy Secretary to Government, Industries Department, United Provinces.
- Syed Afzal, Advocate, Calcutta High Court, District Commandant, Taltala Civic Guards, Calcutta, Bengal.
- Rao Bahadur Harijiwan Ramji Thakkar, Deputy Superintendent of Police, Western India States Agency.
- Clive Geoffrey Thurley, Deputy Director of Survey and Land Records, Madras.
- Norman Kirkland Todd, Manager, R. Sim & Co., Narayanganj, Bengal.
- Edward Sheppard Treasure, District Superintendent of Police, Madras.
- Ram Lal Tuli, MB, BS, DPH, DTM, LM, Deputy Director of Public Health (Temporary), Central Provinces and Berar.
- Lal Chand Verman, Acting Director, Council of Scientific and Industrial Research, Delhi.
- Khan Bahadur Dinshaw Adarji Wadia, Landlord, Toomb, Umbergaon Taluka, Thana District, Bombay.
- George Eric Denham Walker, Indian Police, Political Officer, Sadiya Frontier Tract, Sadiya, Assam.
- Major Charles Mark Ernest Warner, Port Health Officer, Calcutta.
- Captain (Temporary Major) William Henry Wass, Royal Engineers, Stores Officer, Surveys, Survey of India.
- Major William Wilfred Whitburn, Deputy Director of Unskilled Labour Supply, Government of India.
- Herbert Alexander Angus, Hong Kong Clerical Service. For services during internment.
- Jean Virgile Gaston Antoine, Deputy Accountant General, Mauritius.
- Andre Eric Bernard Amoroso-Centeno, Principal Officer, Inland Revenue Department, Trinidad.
- Gerrard Wollaston Baker, FRIC, FCS, Colonial Chemical Service, Government Chemist, Palestine.
- John Austen Percival Cameron, MB, ChB, FRCS, Colonial Medical Service, Medical Officer, Malaya. For services during internment.
- Frederick Melford Campbell, Acting District Officer, British Solomon Islands, now Lieutenant, British Solomon Islands Protectorate Defence Force.
- Elizabeth Carson-Parker. For social welfare services in Ceylon.
- James Ralph Windsor Collett. For services during internment in Malaya.
- Irene Mabel Collins. For welfare services in the Gambia.
- Sybbleboyle Cowley Connell, Chief Clerk, Government Office, St. Vincent, Windward Islands.
- Christopher Early Courtenay. For services during internment in Malaya.
- Mary Burns Craig, Colonial Nursing Service, Assistant Matron, European Hospital, Dar es Salaam, Tanganyika.
- Nathaniel Crichlow, MB, ChB, Colonial Medical Service, Medical Officer, British Solomon Islands Protectorate.
- Sorab Framroze Darashaw, Postmaster, Zanzibar.
- Charles Florence Davidson. For services during internment in Malaya.
- Vivian Dillon, Administrative Secretary, Public Works Department, Malta.
- William Dixon, Mechanical Transport Officer, Uganda.
- William Henry Dolly. For services to education in Trinidad.
- James Fairweather, Colonial Agricultural Service, Agricultural Officer, Malaya. For services during internment.
- Alexander Manfield Ferguson, Supervisor of Customs, Sierra Leone.
- Jack Cooper Fitz-Henry, Superintendent, Hong Kong Fire Brigade. For services during internment.
- Derek Charles Goodfellow, Colonial Administrative Service, District (Officer, Northern Rhodesia.
- Bertha Grey. For services during internment in Malaya.
- Kathleen Gulia. For services as Superintendent of Nurses, Hamrun Hospitals, Malta.
- John Arthur Langdon Hewer, MC. For services in the organisation and production of foodstuffs in Tanganyika.
- Robert Hill, Stationmaster, Kenya & Uganda Railways.
- Charles Edward Hopkins. For services during internment in Malaya.
- Robert Kirkwood, Assistant Superintendent, Posts and Telegraphs Department, British North Borneo. For services during internment.
- William Allan Lambert. For services in connection with leprosy in Tanganyika.
- Stuart Lowrie. For services during internment in Malaya.
- Arthur McColm. For services during internment in Malaya.
- Sybil Kathleen Mackenzie. For services at Tan Tock Seng Hospital, Singapore.
- John Alexander Malin, Assistant Secretary, City Council, Gibraltar.
- Noel James Linnington Margetson, MD, FRCS(Ed.), Medical Officer, District No. 1 and Medical Officer of Health, Montserrat, Leeward Islands.
- M'Ngaine Wa M'Iteria, Chief of the Meru, Kenya.
- Glendowra Rosalie Mutton, Colonial Nursing Service, Senior Nursing Sister, Medical Department, Gold Coast.
- Dorothy Newell. For public service in the Windward Islands.
- Frank Victor Nunes. For Civil Defence services in Jamaica.
- Henry Rupert Carlton Parnall. For services during internment in the Far East.
- Sidney Norman Peters, Chief Clerk, Secretariat, St. Helena.
- Nicos Roussos, Municipal Engineer, Limassol, Cyprus.
- Albert Sauvage. For public services in Seychelles.
- Aloysius Sequeira, Office Superintendent, Aden.
- Douglas Alkins Skan, MRCS, LRCP, Colonial Medical Service, Patho-logist, Nyasaland.
- Hugh Smith, MB, ChB. For services during internment in Malaya.
- Helena May Sprague. For welfare services in Kenya.
- Kow Tai, Chief Theatre Dresser, Tan Tock Seng Hospital, Singapore. For services during internment.
- Joanna Mooney Tallentire. For welfare services in Nigeria.
- Harry Alan Taylor, FRIC, Colonial Chemical Service, Assistant Superintendent and Government Chemist, Imports and Exports Department, Hong Kong. For services during internment.
- Olunwale James Vonbrunn Tuboku-Metzger, Police Magistrate, Sierra Leone.
- Frederick Cornelius Van Zeylen, Director, Public Works Department, Bahamas.
- Aisea Vasutoga, Roko of Nadroga Province, Fiji.
- Margaret Jean Howieson White. For services during internment in Malaya.
- Elsie Clara Willis. For services during internment in Malaya.
- William de Weever Wishart, MB, CM. Municipal Health Officer, British Guiana.
- James Topp Nelson Yankah. For services to education, Gold Coast.
- Edith Margaret Yates. For social welfare services in Nigeria.
- Ismail Aboker, Assistant in the Veterinary Department, British Somaliland.
- Qaid Ahmed Sudqi Al Jundi, Arab Legion.
- Xavier Elpidio Almeida, Chief Clerk, Public Works Department, Uganda.
- Jude Beliavsky, Accountant, Palestine.
- Isiah Claudius During, Assistant Accountant, Treasury, Nigeria.
- Abdel Aziz Shaker El Daoudi, Judge of District Court, Palestine.
- Koram Bin Enduat, British North Borneo Constabulary.
- Shifa Faiz. For meritorious services in Cyprus.
- Munir Khalil Mishalany, MD, Assistant Senior Medical Officer, Palestine.
- Omwami Daudi Benedicto Musoke, County Chief, South Bugishu, Uganda.
- Olaosebikan Adebayo Omololu, Tax Officer, Inland Revenue Department, Nigeria.
- Emmanuel Chukwuemeka Phillips, Supervising Teacher, Nigeria.
- Samuel Adekunle Priddy, Office Assistant, Agricultural Department, Nigeria.
- Hamed Saleh, Liwali of Dar es Salaam, Tanganyika Territory.
- Joseph Saphir, Mayor of Petah Tiqva, Palestine.

== See also ==
- 1946 New Year Honours - Full list of awards.
