= Johannes Plendl =

German physicist and engineer

Johannes "Hans" Plendl (6 December 1900 – 10 May 1991) was a German physicist, engineer, and member of the Nazi Party (NSDAP) who developed radio-navigation and bombing-guidance systems for the Luftwaffe during World War II. In November 1942, Hermann Göring appointed Plendl Bevollmächtigter für Hochfrequenzforschung (Plenipotentiary for High-Frequency Research), giving him responsibility for coordinating high-frequency research in Nazi Germany.

== Early life ==
Plendl was born in 1900 in Munich, German Empire to parents from Northern Bavaria. His surname is most likely a truncated Bavarian dialect form of "Plendlein."

Plendl served in the Imperial German Navy during World War I, in the Torpedo Division stationed at Wilhelmshaven, and won the Iron Cross for bravery. Shortly thereafter, Plendl began his career as a radio and beam engineer for Telefunken corporation.

His early research into meter-wave propagation and radar beams necessitated additional names for newly discovered levels of the Earth's atmosphere, and Plendl is generally credited with coining the term ionosphere. In the early 1930s, he worked on developing the radio communications used in flights by civilian aircraft and the Hindenburg Zeppelin. His research and developments with the Lorenz beam landing system gave birth to what is now known as ILS, Instrument Landing System.

== Flight Navigation Pioneer ==
As Nazi Germany rearmed, Plendl and others saw the possibilities of using radio beams to guide bombers to their target, and they began to develop a system under the code name "X-System" (X-Verfahren). Using technology previously used for his Lorenz beam landing system, Plendl developed a system that would guide planes to their target, and which improved the accuracy of bombing at night or in poor weather conditions. This work was conducted for the German Airforce (Luftwaffe) at the Airforce Experimental Station (Erprobungstelle der Luftwaffe) at Rechlin, Germany, and also at Peenemünde. At the same time the system code named "Knickebein" was coined by the Telefunken electronics firm. Although it could use the Lorenz landing system for guidance, it was less accurate and more prone to jamming. Both systems employed transmitter towers on the English Channel and the North Sea to transmit radar beams over targets in England. German bombers carried basic radar detectors and complex timing devices, also invented by Dr. Plendl, to lead them on the correct path and to guide the timing of the release of their bombs. These were the forerunners of Radial (radio), still used today.

When Germany invaded Poland, the X-System was used effectively against military targets, but on a limited basis, due to the few planes equipped with the X-Device (X-Gerät, the electronic component of the system carried in the plane.) and the short duration of the campaign. During the air war over the England and Scotland known as The Battle of Britain the Knickebein, X-System and Y-System were all used extensively, but their effectiveness was diminished by countermeasures developed by Reginald Victor Jones and other British scientists, who were able use electronic countermeasures to redirect or jam the radio signals of the navigation systems in what has become known as the Battle of the Beams.

Dr. Plendl was given the title of state plenipotentiary and privy councillor (Staatsrat) by Hermann Göring for his work. He was named National Director of High Frequency Research (Bevollmächtigten der Hochfrequenzforschung).

Plendl was dismissed by the German High Command after holding the post for about a year and was replaced by Abraham Esau in December 1943. Sources differ as to why he was dismissed, including that it was after a heavy raid upon Hamburg where the British used a special counterradar technique called Window or chaff, or, according to some accounts, was related to his efforts to protect concentration-camp prisoners by assigning them to research work. Plendl's own account was that it was after he had a heated argument with Generaloberst Weise, the Chief of Flak over areas of responsibility after Plendl developed a new type of Flak shell.

The significance and relevance of Plendl's inventions continues to this day. The Lorenz, Knickebein, X-Gerät, and Y-Gerät systems were precursors to the VHF omnidirectional range and Tactical air navigation system, both still in use today.

== Move to America ==
At the end of the war, Plendl surrendered to the Americans. Like other German scientists, he was recruited by the United States to conduct scientific and military research, as part of "Operation Paperclip." U.S. government records reportedly characterized Plendl as having voiced opposition to the Nazi regime.

The most notable figure associated with Plendl's research program was Hans Mayer, the author of the Oslo Report, who was imprisoned at Dachau concentration camp. In sending this report to the British Government in November 1939 just after the beginning of the war, Mayer performed perhaps the most serious breach of German security in World War II, although this was not known to his colleagues (or the Gestapo) at that time. Mayer had been the Director of the Siemens Research Laboratory in Berlin, up to his arrest in 1943 for listening to the BBC and criticising the Nazi regime. Plendl appointed Mayer to head a radio laboratory even though Mayer's expertise was in telephony, and not in radio.

Plendl finished his military career in the United States Air Force, at their Cambridge Research Laboratory. He specialized in the field of solid-state physics.

== Later life ==
Plendl helped Karl-Otto Kiepenheuer establish a Europe-wide network of stations observing the solar activity in order to predict disturbances of the Ionosphere that interrupted the military radio connections. Plendl and Kiepenheuer may so be seen as the fathers of the science now called space weather, A considerable part of their network prevailed after the war in one or another organisation.

In 1970, Plendl retired to Europe, taking residence in Italy. R.V. Jones, the British scientist who had worked on the other end of the channel to jam Plendl's beams, became a good friend, and the two corresponded regularly and collaborated on several books.
