= Henry Cobden Turner =

British engineer

- Born: 1888
- Died: 1970 (aged 81–82)
- Other name: Harry Cobden Turner
- Education: Manchester Grammar School, Salford Technical School, Manchester College of Technology
- Occupations: Engineer, businessman
- Known for: Development of the radio proximity fuse
- Title: Managing Director of Salford Electrical Instruments

Henry Cobden Turner (1888–1970, also known as Harry Cobden Turner) was an English engineer, businessman, and managing director of Salford Electrical Instruments (SEI).

== Life and career ==
Cobden Turner attended Manchester Grammar School, Salford Technical School, and Manchester College of Technology.

He was made managing director of SEI in 1918, overseeing advancements in instrumentation. Before the outbreak of the Second World War he also became a councillor for Salford, concerning himself with the plight of the unemployed in the city. After the Nazis came to power, he became concerned about the lack of defence technology to counter the threat of aggression.

Shortly before the war began, he had learned from his friend Hans Ferdinand Mayer who worked at Siemens, and who he had met at the CCIF telecommunications conference in Oslo in 1938, that the Germany was working on developing influence fuses for its artillery. This inspired them to use their combined skills to propose a new kind of fuze.

From late 1939, Cobden Turner contributed to the development of the radio proximity fuse, a critical innovation in military technology. A high frequency oscillator would transit disruptive signals to bombs, causing them to detonate. On 8 May 1940 a proposal for the device was submitted to the Royal Aircraft Establishment.

He continued to communicate with Mayer via an intermediary in neutral Denmark throughout the war. Together they organised the escape of a Jewish girl from Nazi Germany, who then lived with Cobden Turner and his family at their home. Mayer was later revealed as the source of the Oslo Report, one of the biggest German military leaks of the war, which he had planned to send to Cobden Turner, but ultimately decided it was safer to send it to the British Legation in Oslo. There, it ended up in the hands of military intelligence specialist Reginald Victor Jones.

By chance, Cobden Turner met Reginald Victor Jones in person while travelling in 1953, beginning several years of correspondence between the two. He also consulted with him on technical matters on behalf of SEI until he retired from his role there in 1957. Jones pushed for official recognition of Cobden Turner's work.

Henry Cobden Turner died in 1970.

=== Professional bodies ===
He became a full member of the Institution of Electrical Engineers (IEE) in 1924, and was elected a Fellow in 1966. He served on the IEE North-Western Centre Committee from 1927 to 1939, held the position of vice-chairman from 1939 to 1941, and served as chairman from 1941 to 1942. He also chaired the IEE Meter and Instrument Section Committee in 1937–1938.
