= C. Lorenz AG =

German electrical and electronics company

C. Lorenz A.G.
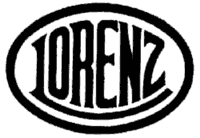
- Type: Aktiengesellschaft (from 1906)
- Industry: electrical industry manufacture of communication equipment
- Predecessor: Standard Elektrizitätsgesellschaft; Telephonfabrik Berliner
- Founded: July 1, 1880
- Defunct: March 31, 1958
- Fate: merged with Standard Elektrik Lorenz AG
- Headquarters: Berlin-Kreuzberg (1880-1917); Tempelhof (1917-1920); Berlin-Tempelhof (1920-1948); Stuttgart-Zuffenhausen (1948-1958)
- Key people: Carl Lorenz (1880–1889); Alfred Lorenz (1889–1890); Robert Held (1890–1924); Georg Wolf (1925–1931); Jens Bache-Wiig (1931–1933); Walter Max Hahnemann (1934–1944); Carl Schmid (1944–1949); Martin Kluge (1950–1958)

C. Lorenz AG (1880–1958) was a German electrical and electronics firm primarily located in Berlin. It innovated, developed, and marketed products for electric lighting, telegraphy, telephony, radar, and radio. It was acquired by ITT in 1930 and became part of the newly founded company Standard Elektrik Lorenz (SEL) Stuttgart in 1958, when it merged with Standard Elektrizitätsgesellschaft and several other smaller companies owned by ITT. In 1987, SEL merged with the French companies Compagnie Générale d'Electricité and Alcatel to form the new Alcatel SEL.

== History ==
Around 1870, Carl Lorenz (1844–1889) opened a shop in Berlin to manufacture electrical lighting products. The shop entered the telegraph field in 1880, taking the name C. Lorenz Telegraphenbauanstalt. Following the death of Carl Lorenz, the firm was acquired in 1890 by textile businessman Robert Held (1862–1924). Held retained the firm's original name, and Carl's brother, Alfred Lorenz, was made the technical director. Under Held, the firm became a major supplier of telegraph and signaling equipment for the National Railroad. Held then expanded into the telephone market in 1893, buying Lewart, and through this acquisition gaining a telephone-supplier position with the Postal Service. Typewriters were added as products in 1898, and around the turn of the century, operating branches were added in several cities. In 1906, the firm registered for public trading as C. Lorenz AG (hereafter "Lorenz").

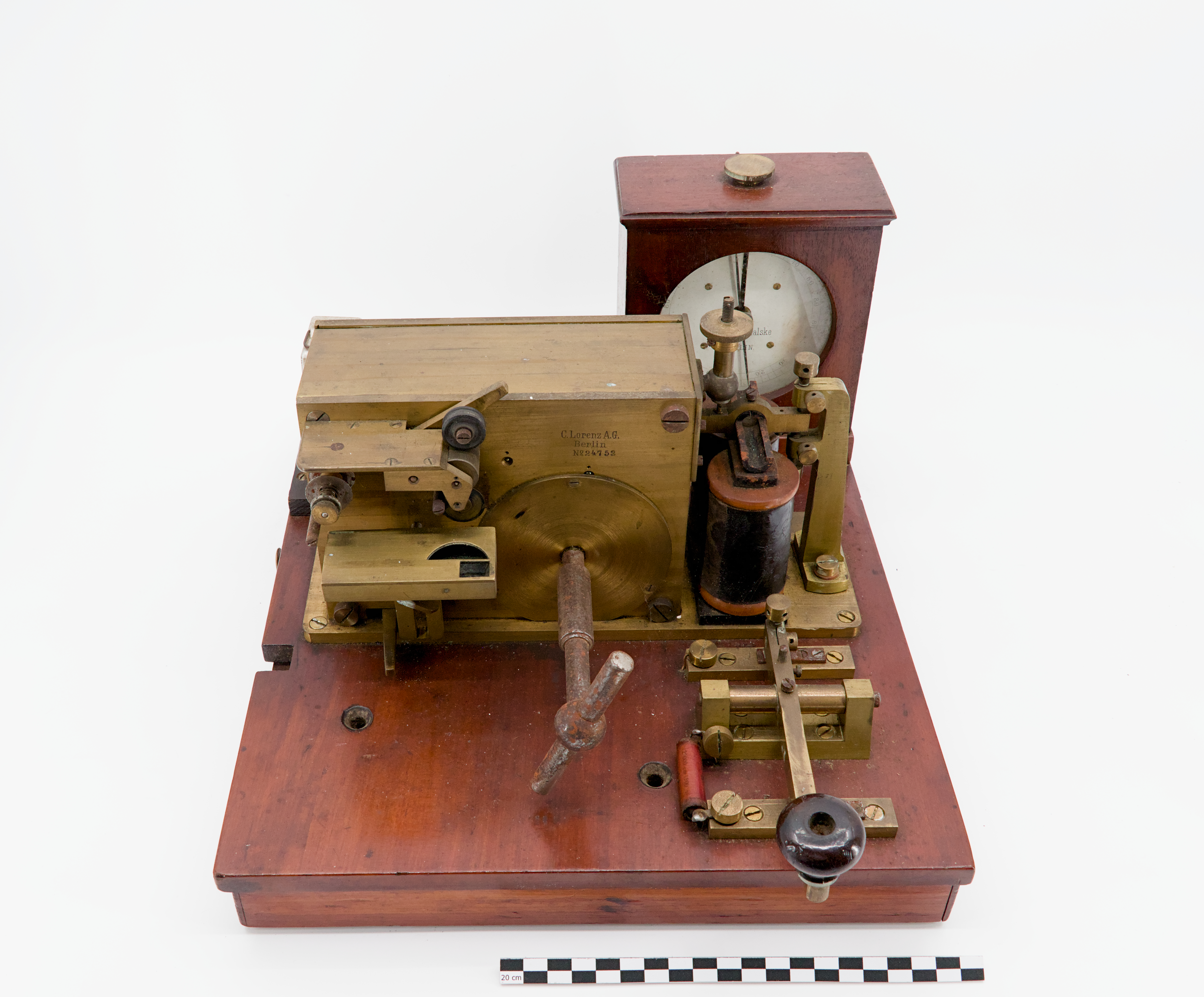
Telegraph station made by C. Lorenz AG, circa 1890.

At the start of World War I, Lorenz had grown to about 3,000 employees and was a major supplier to the German military of land-line telephone and telegraph equipment and had also entered the wireless field. For this expansion, a large factory was built in the Tempelhof district of Berlin, and by 1918, the headquarters and research operations also occupied this facility. When World War I ended, Lorenz greatly decreased in size and turned to producing home radios, broadcast transmitters, and aircraft communications sets. In 1919, Lorenz initiated radio broadcasting (transmitting voice and music) in Germany, and their first home receiver, the Liebhaber-Empfänger, was introduced in 1923. Throughout the 1920s, radios and associated valves (vacuum tubes) were major products manufactured by Lorenz. In this, the firm was a primary competitor of Telefunken.

After Held's death, the controlling stock became available and was eventually bought in 1930 by Standard Elektrizitätsgesellschaft, a subsidiary of the American corporation International Telephone and Telegraph (ITT); Lorenz as a firm, however, continued to operate independently. In 1932, development of a new type of radio navigation system — soon known worldwide as the Lorenz beam — gave a major extension of their aircraft radio business. Lorenz patented the ferrite antenna in 1935, and thereafter it was used in most home receivers.

As Germany prepared for another war, Lorenz again became strongly engaged in manufacturing materiel for the military. Production of radio tubes for the German Army started in 1937 and was followed by the building of communication sets and similar electronics. It has been claimed that the parent company, ITT, had ties to the Nazi Party. World War II began with Germany invading Poland on 1 September 1939. Lorenz was already a major supplier for the German military, and soon greatly expanded its production facilities. In 1940, Lorenz acquired G. Schaub Apparatebau-Gesellschaft; its many factories were mainly used for low-cost manufacturing.

Military products from Lorenz during World War II included land-based and airborne radars, two-way radio sets, wire recorders, radio tubes, and Germany's most secure communications device, the Lorenz cipher machine. Lorenz owned 25% of Focke-Wulf, the German aircraft firm that built some of the most successful Luftwaffe fighter aircraft. Ludwig Roselius of Kaffee Hag had contractual obligations with Lorenz and Sosthenes Behn of ITT Corporation. For wartime work, Lorenz, like many other German manufacturing firms, turned to inmates of Nazi-operated labor camps. At the high point of the war, Lorenz had about 24,000 workers in 12 operating facilities. The largest factories were in Berlin, Plauen, Mühlhausen (vacuum tube factory), and underground shops within large caves in the Hanover area. A women's slave labor camp, a branch of the Buchenwald concentration camp, was directly outside Mühlhausen.

In 1948, Lorenz started anew. Some factories had been closed, and those in the Eastern Zone were either taken over by, or moved to, the Soviet Union. Lorenz headquarters moved to the Zuffenhausen district of Stuttgart. During the 1950s, Lorenz recovered strongly and had several branches: Berlin-Tempelhof (radio communications and broadcasting research); Esslingen am Neckar (radio tubes); Landshut (electrical machines, broadcasting equipment, and signal systems); Pforzheim I (research and model workshop for small-scale transmitting equipment); Pforzheim II (telex factory); and Schaub Pforzheim (radio and television receivers). In 1954, the brand name of radio and television sets was changed to Schaub-Lorenz.

In 1958, C. Lorenz AG ceased to exist as an independent company. ITT reorganized its operations in Germany by merging Lorenz, Standard Elektrizitätsgesellschaft, and several others into a new company called Standard Elektrik Lorenz (or SEL). In 1961, the company also became the major shareholder of radio firm Graetz. In 1987, SEL, by then an extremely diversified company, merged with French companies Compagnie Générale d'Electricité and Alcatel, with the new company being known simply as Alcatel and the German part known as Alcatel SEL AG. The new company eventually sold to Nokia-Graetz GmbH the operations that had earlier been Lorenz.

== Notable accomplishments and products ==
=== Manufacturing technique ===
Following World War I, as Lorenz initiated new product lines, research was done in new manufacturing techniques; this resulted in modular electronics manufacturing that was later widely adopted in Germany. Previously, electronic equipment had been either assembled by hand or mass-produced in a similar fashion to an automobile: a chassis goes down an assembly line and workers insert and fasten parts into the chassis or sub-chassis one person at a time. Lorenz' solution was to manufacture all products in a modular fashion. Circuits with specific functions were built into die-cast boxes and then tested to a specification; the modules were connected together and assembled into a finished product and then received final quality testing. This not only reduced the cost of testing, but also gave a great advantage to field maintenance.

=== Radio products ===
The arc transmitter, the first generator of continuous radio signals, was invented by Danish engineer Valdemar Poulsen. Rights were obtained by Lorenz to manufacture this transmitter, and the firm entered the commercial field of radio in 1906. Soon after this, Lorenz used the arc transmitter to develop for the German Navy the first radiotelephone. In 1919, in an experimental station at Eberswalde, Lorenz used a high-power Poulsen transmitter in what would become radio broadcasting. Most of the early broadcast stations in Germany used Lorenz transmitters.

In cooperation with C. Schaub Apparatebau GmbH, an inexpensive receiver, the DKE-38, was put on the market by Lorenz in 1938; these radios were commonly referred to as Goebbelsschnauze ("Goebbels' snout") because they were widely used to spread Nazi propaganda (Joseph Goebbels was Nazi Germany's Minister of Propaganda). Schaub was totally acquired by Lorenz in 1940 and built many thousands of these sets.

=== Aircraft guidance systems ===
Early in the development of radio, Lorenz scientist Otto Scheller invented a system composed of four antennas set in the corners of a large square and generating an array of overlapping, very narrow beams. In 1932, Ernst Kramer of Lorenz used this antenna in developing a system radiating a dot-dash tone to one side of the beam and a dash-dot on the other; when on path, the tone would be continuous. Called Ultrakurzwellen-Landefunkfeuer (LEF) or commonly, Lorenz beam, this system was sold worldwide for aircraft guidance and blind landing.

Hans Plendt at the German Laboratory for Aviation investigated changes in the LEF commercial system to allow more direct guidance for Luftwaffe aircraft and also to give relatively precise location to the aircraft; this was particularly useful for bomb-release points. Code-named X-Leitstrahlbake (Directional Beacon), this was accepted by the Luftwaffe in 1937. Lorenz received a contract for supplying the ground equipment, and the aircraft receivers were the same as used in the LEF. By 1939, Germany had installed X-Leitstrahlbake stations radiating into other countries, including Great Britain, but they did not raise suspicions since the signals were essentially the same as those from the standard Lorenz LEF system. The X-Leitstrahlbake was used when night-time bombing began in 1940. The British developed countermeasure beams, followed by further improvements by the Germans.

=== Radar systems ===
In the mid-1930s, radio-based military equipment for detecting, tracking and ranging began to be researched in great secrecy by several nations. Such equipment would ultimately be universally called radar. In Germany, the name Funkmessgerät (radio measuring device) was used. (Target detection by radio had been studied since the early 1900s, but the ranging function had been elusive until pulsing the transmitted signal allowed the propagation time, and thus range, to be measured.)

Research in Funkmessgerät was started by Gottfried Müller at Lorenz, and by mid-1936 a pulse-modulated set was demonstrated. After an unsuccessful attempt to interest the German Navy, Müller's team turned to developing a system for supporting Flugzeugabwehrkanone (Flak, anti-aircraft guns). This set included a cathode ray tube that allowed the range to be shown in a circular display. In 1938, the Ordnance Office of the German Army gave Lorenz a contract to develop a prototype Flak-aiming set, code-named Kurfürst. Although not put into immediate production, when antiaircraft guns were needed to protect against bombing by the Allies, two versions were produced by Lorenz: Tiefentwiel, a mobile system for use against low-flying aircraft, and Jadgwagen, a mobile unit used for air surveillance.

In mid-1941, a British ASV (air-to-surface-vessel) Mk. II radar was salvaged by Germany from a downed RAF bomber. This set was different from any that Germany had, so the Luftwaffe tasked Lorenz with developing a similar system. Before the end of the year, Müller’s team could detect large ships, surfaced submarines, submarine periscopes, flying aircraft, and land features. Called FuG 200 Hohentwiel, it was put into production in 1942 and was used on large reconnaissance aircraft. In 1943, an adaptation called Hohentwiel-U was provided for submarines. For the remainder of the war, about 150 sets of both versions were produced each month.

=== Cipher machines ===
Lorenz started manufacturing typewriters in the late 1890s. As a natural outgrowth of typewriters and telegraph sets, a teleprinter machine was developed by Lorenz in 1900. Many types of this device were Lorenz products over the years. In 1918, a German inventor developed a cipher machine using multiple rotors with pins representing alphabet letters. Placed on the commercial market as the Enigma machine, it was adopted by the German Navy and Army in the 1920s. The Enigma, however, had deficiencies, and the German Army High Command asked Lorenz to develop a new cipher machine that would allow communication by radio in extreme secrecy.

Called the Schlüsselzusatz (cipher attachment), the Lorenz cipher machine was an in-line addition to their standard teleprinter. The Lorenz SZ40 was introduced on an experimental basis in 1940, and the enhanced SZ42A machine was used from February 1943 and the SZ42B from June 1944 onwards for high-level communications between the Supreme Command of the Armed Forces in Berlin and Army Commands throughout occupied Europe. Unlike Enigma, no physical Lorenz machine reached Allies’ hands until the very end of the war in Europe.
