= Blind Landing Experimental Unit =

English government unit

The Blind Landing Experimental Unit, abbreviated BLEU, was a unit of the British government tasked with creating an early autolanding system for military and civilian aircraft from the late 1940s until the mid-1960s.

== Background ==
Pilots in the early days of aviation relied on dead reckoning to find out where they were flying, which proved difficult or impossible at night or in bad weather. A 1925 United States Post Office study found that 76% of its forced landings were due to weather, which highlighted the early need for a system to facilitate blind landings. Early suggestions at addressing the problem ranged from using primitive radio signals to placing emergency landing strips periodically near major highways. Experiences from the Second World War called more attention to the problem. Bombers based in Britain would sometimes return to their home bases in the early morning hours to find all of their landing sites completely fogged in, which resulted in the senseless loss of airframes and aircrews. In the post-war period, aviation experts knew that there would be benefits to both military and civilian flyers, as military missions would be made possible in all conditions and airlines could avoid the wasteful and expensive practice of diverting away from fogged in airports.

Several blind-landing systems had been developed in the pre-war era, notably the US Diamond-Dunmore system and the German Lorenz beam concepts. Both relied, to some degree, on the voice radios in the aircraft, which were common on larger aircraft of the era. Diamond-Dunmore appears to have seen no active uses, but the Lorenz system was deployed at major airports in Germany, the UK and other European locations and their related foreign fields. These generally operated in common medium-wave frequencies on the order of 300 to 400 kHz, frequencies that were, by the mid-war era, on the decidedly low-frequency range. The optical resolution of any system is a combination of the wavelength and the size of the antenna system, so using these frequencies resulted in relatively low accuracy. During the war, experiments were carried out with similar systems working at VHF frequencies around 100 MHz and a variety of such systems were used at many military airfields.

== Origins of autoland ==
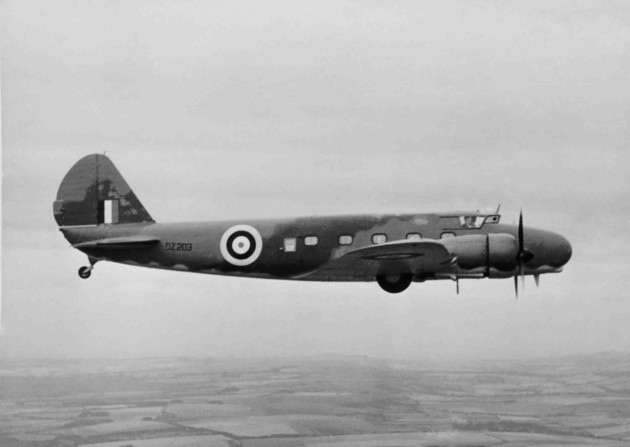
DZ203, the airplane used in system trials

Before the formation of BLEU, an automatic landing was made at the Telecommunications Flying Unit (TFU) of the TRE at RAF Defford in a Boeing 247D aircraft, DZ203, early in 1945, using the American SCS 51 radio guidance system. Landings were made in complete darkness, with no landing lights and all other lights obscured by the wartime blackout. There was no flare-out; the low approach speed and shallow glide angle meant that the aircraft could be allowed to fly straight onto the ground. SCS 51 was the basis for the Instrument Landing System (ILS), adopted by ICAO in 1948.

There was an alternative system to the SCS 51 from Col. Moseley and that was a radar-based system wholly devised, developed and trialled by F/O L. C. Barber and his colleagues at Defford. This system effectively gave range and height data which could be added to autopilot heading info. (Note: The full technical description of this is available in the archives at RAF Museum Hendon, reference X005-4863, and includes original photographic records of Boeing 247 DZ203.)

The Blind Landing Experimental Unit (BLEU) of the Royal Aircraft Establishment (RAE) was formed at RAF Woodbridge and RAF Martlesham Heath during 1945 and 1946. It was a multi-disciplinary unit, drawing staff from the RAE, Farnborough and the Telecommunications Research Establishment, Malvern (TRE). The terms of reference were that the unit "will operate as a satellite of the RAE and will be responsible for the development on blind approach and landing of RAF, Naval and Civil aircraft". Research during the first few years at BLEU led to the conclusion that a promising approach to blind landing would be a fully automatic system, and produced a definition of the requirements for such a system, later designated Autoland.

The Instrument Landing System (ILS) was introduced in the post-war era based on the SCS 51 concepts. This used two separate radio signals, one for lateral guidance, the "localizer" and the other for vertical guidance, the "glideslope". They both worked on the same basic principle; each of the signals was broadcast on a separate carrier frequency with a fixed relationship so that the glideslope frequency was always a fixed amount away from the localizer.

The signals were split on their way to their respective antennas and amplitude modulated with a low-frequency signal, 90 Hz or 150 Hz. The two signals were then sent out of directional antennas that produced large broadcast patterns aimed slightly left (90) and right (150) of the runway mid-line or above (90) and below (150) the glideslope. The patterns were relatively wide and aimed such that they overlapped in the center, indicating the proper line to fly.

While the system worked and was relatively simple to implement using 1940s technology, it was not accurate enough to provide guidance during landing, with accuracy on the order of a few hundred feet. ILS approaches ended at 200 feet over the runway, by which time the pilot had to be able to see the runway visually, or call off their approach. This was not nearly accurate enough for a truly automated system.

BLEU's first attempt at solving the problem was to place two cables, one mile long, extending along each side of the runway, similar to the Ambrose Channel pilot cable. A detector in the aircraft could see the signal from the cables and align itself very accurately along the midline of the runway. For vertical guidance, a new FM radio altimeter that BLEU developed was capable of resolving height differences to 2 feet at low altitude. The team safely conducted thousands of test landings using this system.

BLEU realized that most airports did not have room to place one-mile cables, so they continued working on a radio-driven solution. In collaboration with Smiths Industries Ltd., BLEU also developed coupling units to derive the commands to the autopilot from the guidance signals, and auto-throttle.

Components of the system were developed separately on several types of aircraft, including the Lancaster, Viking, Devon and the Albemarle. A demonstration of the techniques used was given to military and government representatives in May 1949. By 1950 the entire system had been installed on a DH Devon and the first demonstration of Autoland was given on that aircraft on 3 July 1950. Over the next 20 years, BLEU in conjunction with UK industry and the UK airworthiness authority, was responsible for almost all of the pioneering work needed to convert the concept of those experimental demonstrations into safe, accurate blind landings by large transport aircraft. The system in use during the early 2000s is basically the same as that used experimentally in 1950. The following diagram, from J S Shayler's 1958 memorandum, shows how the different components of the system, and guidance signals, were used during the consecutive phases of an automatic landing.

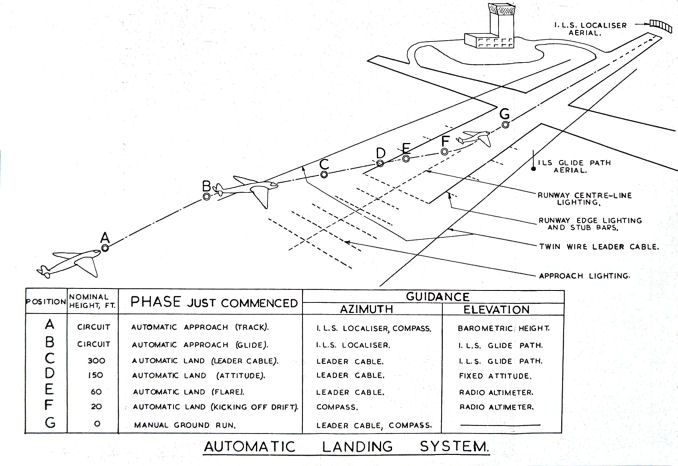
Phases of the Automatic Landing System, as described by J S Shayler in 1958

== BLEU during the 1950s and 1960s ==
During the early 1950s, as a preliminary to the development of the full Autoland system, automatic approach trials were carried out on Valetta, Meteor and Canberra aircraft. The Canberra, VN799, was acquired in 1953 but was a write-off following a crash landing in August that year due to a double engine failure, fortunately without serious injury to the crew.

At that time, Autoland had lower priority because efforts were concentrated on other projects including rapid landing of aircraft for RAF Fighter Command, visual aids for pilots, runway approach lighting and an approach aid using DME with Barbro. That changed when Operational Requirement 947 (OR947) for automatic landing on the V-Force bomber fleet was issued in 1954. At that time the V-bomber force was the UK's main contribution to the strategic nuclear power of the west and all-weather operation was essential. There was also renewed interest in automatic landing for civil aviation. As the next step in the development, the flare-out and coupling units from the Devon were linked to a Smiths Type D autopilot and installed in Varsity WF417, a much larger aircraft, capable of carrying 38 people rather than 10 in the Devon. The first fully automatic approach and landing was made by WF417 on 11 November 1954 under calm and misty conditions. A similar system was installed in Canberra WE189 to provide the first application of Autoland to jet-type aircraft. Automatic approaches and automatic landings were recorded by WE189 but the development was interrupted in April 1956 when the facilities at Woodbridge, which had the only suitable leader cable installation, ceased to be available to BLEU. Development of auto-flare and automatic kicking-off drift was continued at RAF Wittering, but in September that year WE189, returning from tests at Wittering, crashed due to engine failure on an approach when returning to its base at Martlesham Heath. The pilot, Flt. Lt. Les Coe, and the BLEU scientist in charge of the project, Mr. Joe Birkle, were killed.

Early in 1957 BLEU moved from Martlesham Heath to a newly equipped airfield at Thurleigh, the base for RAE Bedford. The development was continued in a third Canberra, WJ992, based on the results obtained with WE189. Experimental flights in WJ992 began late in 1957, leading to automatic landings with auto-throttle in March 1958. The following notes are from the logbook of the BLEU technologist carrying out the development: 10 March 1958 (the 38th flight of that programme): "Very little drift, about 0.3g – heights 150-55-15-0". That was with manual throttle, but auto throttle was used on 12 March, in a strong crosswind. 17 March saw "strong tailwind, 20 – 25 kt., pronounced float" and on 20 June, after adjustments during a further 20 flights: "not bad – about 0.7 g nicely on main wheels – kicking off drift OK". Then on 26 June: "Throttles off at 50ft. Very pleasing results" and on 20 August "hands and feet off". Recordings of automatic landings in that aircraft started on 8 July 1958, flight no. 69. Results for automatic landings in Canberra aircraft were quoted by Wood in 1957 and published by Charnley in 1959, as for a "medium size jet aircraft". By October 1958, BLEU had completed over 2,000 fully automatic landings, mainly in the Canberra and Varsity aircraft.

The V-bomber project to install and develop Autoland on Vulcan XA899, originally classified as Secret, ran in parallel with the Canberra and Varsity work. The first automatic landings in the Vulcan were made between December 1959 and April 1960. Trials were carried out later that year and the system was accepted for military service in 1961.

It was recognised that leader cable would be impractical at some airports, but that it could be dispensed with if improvements could be made to ILS. Some improvement resulted from a narrow beam localizer aerial system developed by BLEU during the early 1950s and by 1958 automatic landings had been made using only ILS localiser for azimuth guidance. That required a good site but by the early 1960s radically new aerial designs for the ILS transmitters developed by Standard Telephones & Cables (ST&C) improved ILS to an extent that leader cable could be dispensed with.

For many years there had been discussions between the UK Ministry of Aviation and the US Federal Aviation Agency (FAA) on guidance aids for landing in poor visibility. The Americans favoured a "pilot in the loop" technique, with improved aids for the pilot, over the fully automatic system preferred in the UK. In 1961, to gain experience with "the BLEU automatic landing system" the FAA sent a Douglas DC-7 to RAE Bedford for the system to be installed and tested. After that and further tests on return to Atlantic City, the FAA were convinced and thereafter strongly supported a fully automatic solution to the all-weather problem which later was adopted internationally.

Up to that stage the Autoland system had been realised only as a "single-lane" or single channel system, without any redundancy to protect against equipment failure. During the late 1950s and early 1960s increased cooperation between BLEU, the UK Civil Aviation Authority (CAA) and companies in the aviation industry with BEA and BOAC led to the definition of safety requirements in terms of a specification for maximum tolerable failure rates. In 1961, the UK Air Registration Board (ARB) of the CAA issued a working document BCAR 367 "Airworthiness Requirements for Autoflare and Automatic Landing" which formed the basis for the definitions for weather visibility categories adopted by ICAO in 1965. In 1959, contracts were placed by BEA and BOAC to develop automatic landing, based on Autoland, for the Trident and the VC10. The Trident used a triplex system with no common elements, so that a failure in one of the three channels could be detected and that channel eliminated. "Nuisance disconnects" were an early problem with that system, eventually solved by the industry, using torque switches with a controlled degree of lost motion. The introduction of Autoland for Category 3 operation in BEA's Trident fleet required a huge effort by BEA, Hawker Siddeley Aviation, Smiths Industries and BLEU. A triplex system was also developed by Smiths and BLEU for the RAF's Belfast freighter.

The VC10 used an Elliott duplicated monitored system. Later, the Concorde system was basically an improved version of the VC10 one, benefiting from advances in electronic circuit technology during the late 1960s. By 1980, the Trident had carried out more than 50,000 in-service automatic landings. The VC10 accrued 3,500 automatic landings before use of the system was curtailed in 1974 for economic reasons. By 1980, Concorde had performed nearly 1,500 automatic landings in passenger service.

BLEU (renamed the Operational Systems Division of RAE in 1974) continued to play a leading role in the development of aircraft guidance systems, using a variety of aircraft including DH Comet, BAC 1–11, HS 748 (to replace the Varsities, which had been the main "work horses" for BLEU experiments for more than a decade) and VC-10 until the closure of RAE Bedford in 1994.

=== BLEU system ===
BLEU knew that an ideal system would require components based on the ground and in aircraft. The former system would have to consist of a signal without the land use problems of the cable-based system or the accuracy issues of ILS. All incoming aircraft would need to be equipped with a sensor to receive the signal, a super-precise altimeter, and a reliable autopilot. The barometric altimeters in use at the time were only capable of providing a rough estimate of altitude, so BLEU developed a plane-based radar altimeter to complement its beam so planes knew when to flare up for landing.

BLEU's work resulted in an eponymous system for controlling airplane landings. Flight Lieutenant Noel Adams made the first automatic landing on 3 July 1950 in BLEU's test plane, a Vickers Varsity. After demonstrating the system's success, BLEU needed to prove that it was safe. The required standard was that any landing system could not cause more than one accident in every ten million landings. BLEU's engineers continued refining the system as its test pilots made countless automated landings in the Varsity. When it was closed due to fog, they would make test landings at London Heathrow International Airport.

In his 1959 paper John Charnley, then Superintendent of the BLEU, concluded a discussion of statistical results by saying that "It is fair to claim, therefore, that not only will the automatic system land the aircraft when the weather prevents the human pilot, it also performs the operation much more precisely". The system was approved for commercial use in 1964, and on 4 November 1964, Captain Eric Poole landed a British European Airways flight at Heathrow with visibility of 40 meters, which was the first use of the system to land a commercial flight in such severe conditions.

== Legacy ==
The BLEU played a vital role in the development of autolanding, and descendants of its system are still in use around the world today.

== See also ==
- Index of aviation articles
- Lists of aviation topics
- List of aviation, avionics, aerospace and aeronautical abbreviations
