= Frank Griffiths (pilot) =

Royal Air Force pilot

Frank Cromwell Griffiths
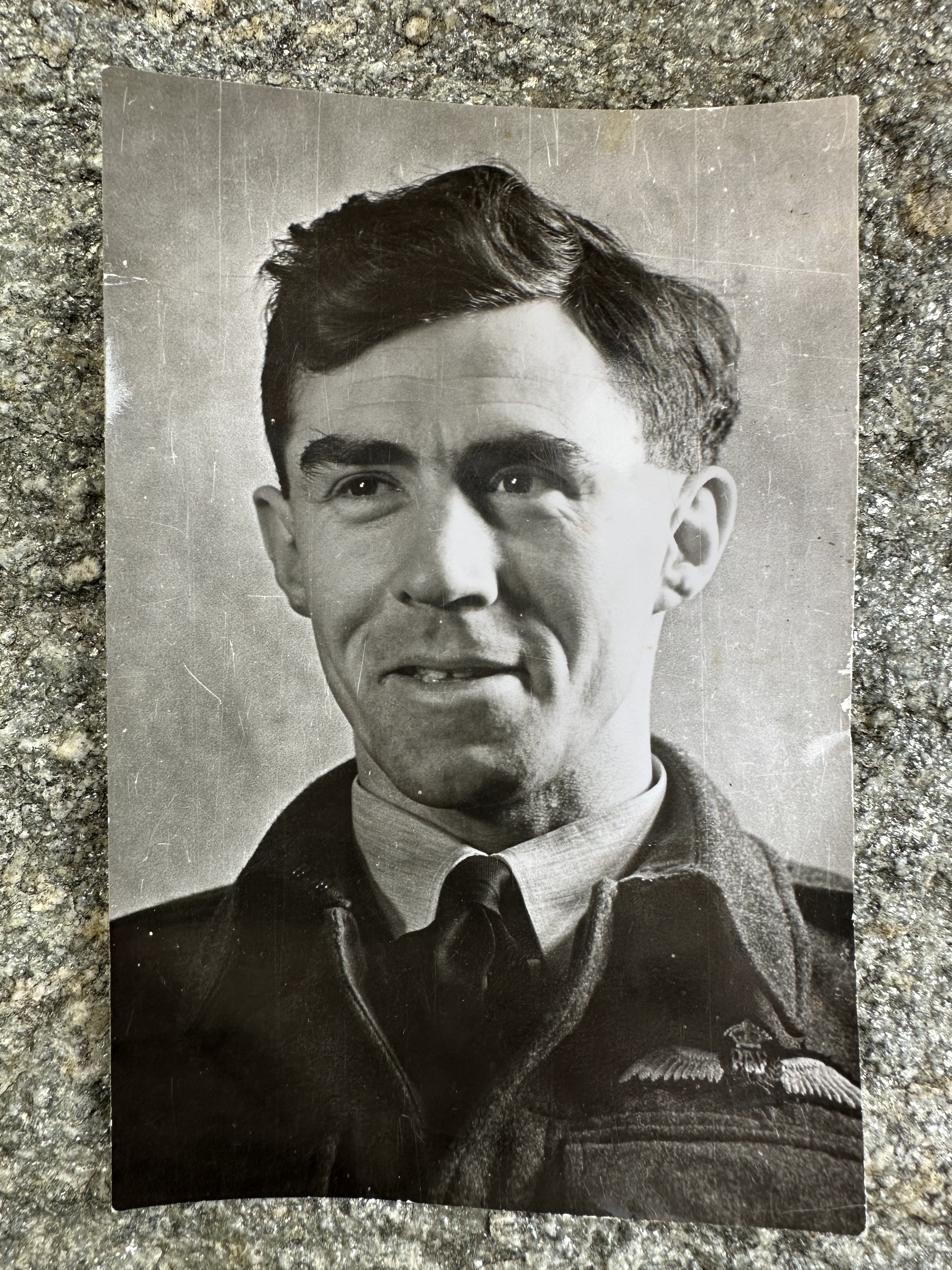
- Frank Griffiths
- Born: 1 May 1912; West Kirby, Cheshire
- Died: 23 March 1996 (Age 83); Ruthin, Clwyd
- Military career
- Allegiance: United Kingdom
- Branch: Royal Air Force
- Service years: 1936 - 1977
- Rank: Group Captain
- Nicknames: 'Griff', 'Crom', 'Taffy'
- Service number: 37967
- Unit: 138 Squadron (Special Duties) 62 Squadron Christchurch Special Duty Flight Blind Landings Experimental Unit
- Known for: World's first autolanding
- Conflicts: Second World War
- Awards: DFC, AFC, Légion d'Honneur, Croix de Guerre with palm, Médaille de la Résistance, Dutch DFC

Frank Cromwell Griffiths, DFC, AFC, (1 May 1912 – 27 March 1996), nicknamed 'Griff', was a special duties pilot in the Royal Air Force during the Second World War who flew over 60 types of aircraft as a test pilot. In August 1943, Griffiths was shot down delivering supplies to the French Resistance near Annecy in southeast France. The only survivor, he spent the next three months escaping via France, Switzerland and Spain, before returning to Britain and to test piloting in early 1944. In 1945, as part of the Blind Landings Experimental Unit, he recorded the world's first auto landing, a forerunner of autopilot. He retired from the RAF in 1962 as a Group Captain.

== Early life ==
Born in West Kirby on the northern tip of the Wirral, Cheshire, Griffiths was the youngest of four children and enjoyed a privileged childhood thanks to his father's building company. Griffiths was educated at Radley College until the Wall Street Crash bankrupted his father.

On leaving school, Griffiths lived on a boat for the next six years, sailing around the north Wales coast in the summers and mooring in the Liverpool Docks in the winter. Unusually for the time, he was atheist, tee-total and pro-trade union. He joined the RAF in 1936 aged 24 on a short service commission and was confirmed as a Pilot Officer in June 1937.

== Second World War ==
At the outbreak of war, Griffiths was a Flying Officer in 62 Squadron primarily flying the Bristol Blenheim. The squadron was posted to Malaya in September 1939 to shore up the Empire in the Far East, where Griffiths became close friends with Arthur 'Pongo' Scarf VC. The reemergence of an old back injury led to Griffiths being classified 'unfit for duties' and sent back to England for treatment.

In November 1940, Griffiths joined the Christchurch Special Duties flight as a test pilot. During the next two years and seven months at RAF Christchurch and RAF Defford, he helped the Telecommunications Research Establishment deliver breakthroughs in aviation such as airborne radar, Gee and Rebecca/Eureka which helped turn the tide against Germany, for which he was awarded an AFC.

Griffiths survived several near-death experiences during these years, including plummeting 10,000 feet in a Hurricane after the throttle jammed and extreme G-force prevented him from baling out, an incident when his Swordfish caught fire over Liverpool with two WRENS onboard and almost colliding with a submarine while trying to take off in its slick in a Walrus seaplane.

With 1,842 hours of flying on 60 types of aircraft, Griffiths applied to be made operational in April 1943. He was posted to 138 Squadron (Special Duties) based at RAF Tempsford as a Squadron Leader. For the next three months, Griffiths flew 16 missions in a Halifax over occupied Europe, infiltrating SOE agents via parachute and dropping war material to resistance movements.

On 14 August, Griffiths took off on Operation Pimento but was shot down by small arms fire near Annecy in southeast France. His aircraft crashed on the small village of Meythet, killing all six crew and five civilians. Badly wounded, Griffiths was taken in by the French Resistance and spent the next 108 days escaping through France, Switzerland, Spain to Gibraltar where, on 30 November, he was flown home. He was transported out of France by Marie-Louise Dissard, aka Francoise, an elderly Frenchwoman who ran an 'escape line' out of France for downed aviators.

Awarded a DFC and promoted to Wing Commander, Griffiths rejoined the Telecommunications Research Establishment in early 1944 and worked for the Blind Landings Experimental Unit, piloting the world's first auto landing, a forerunner of autopilot. Postings in Transport Command followed after the war and Griffiths reached Group Captain in 1953, the rank he would eventually retire at in 1962. He reengaged as Squadron leader Administrative Officer in north Wales immediately, teaching young pilots until his eventual full retirement in 1977 after 41 years' service.

== Personal life ==
Griffiths married WAAF Ruth Fuller in August 1941 after meeting during his period of recovery in RAF Hospital Torquay. They had four children.

A keen sailor and horse rider, Griffiths supported the RNLI and Riding for the Disabled charities after the war and kept a flock of sheep on a roundabout near Ruthin.

He spent retirement near Ruthin and died in March 1996 aged 86. His ashes are spread near the summit of Moel Famau mountain.

== Other ==
Griffiths' great-grandson Adam Hart retraced his escape through Europe in 2022 meeting descendants of people who had helped Griffiths. Griffiths' escape and Hart's retracing are told in the book Operation Pimento (Hodder, June 2025).

Hart appeared in Season 47 Episode of the Antiques Roadshow to show Frank Griffiths' logbooks and medals.
