= Battle of the Beams =

Electronic warfare conflict in the Second World War

The Battle of the Beams was a period early in the Second World War when bombers of the German Air Force (Luftwaffe) used a number of increasingly accurate systems of radio navigation for night bombing in the United Kingdom. British scientific intelligence at the Air Ministry fought back with a variety of their own increasingly effective means, involving jamming and deception signals. The period ended when the Wehrmacht moved their forces to the East in May 1941, in preparation for the attack on the Soviet Union.

The idea of beam radio navigation was developed during the 1930s, initially as a blind landing aid. The basic concept is to produce two directional radio signals that are aimed slightly to the left and right of a runway's midline. Radio operators in the aircraft listen for these signals and determine which of the two beams they are flying in. This is normally accomplished by sending Morse code signals into the two beams, to identify right and left.

For bombing, the Luftwaffe built huge versions of the antennas to provide much greater accuracy at long range, named Knickebein and X-Gerät. These were used during the early stages of the Blitz with great effect, in one case laying a strip of bombs down the centerline of a factory deep in England. Tipped off about the system's operation by pre-war military intelligence, the British responded by sending their own Morse code signals so that the aircraft crew believed they were always properly centred in the beam while they flew wildly off course. The Germans became convinced the British had somehow learned to bend radio signals.

When the problem became widespread, the Germans introduced a new system that worked on different principles, the Y-Gerät. Having guessed the nature of this system from a passing mention, the British had already deployed countermeasures that rendered the system useless almost as soon as it was used. The Germans eventually abandoned the entire concept of radio navigation over the UK, concluding the British would continue to successfully jam it.

== Background ==
The Lorenz beam and its two lobes. The "equisignal" area in the centre grows narrower, and more accurate, as the aircraft approaches the runway.

Before the start of the war on 1 September 1939, Lufthansa and the German aircraft industry invested heavily in the development of commercial aviation, and in systems and methods that would improve safety and reliability. Considerable effort went into blind-landing aids which allowed aircraft to approach an airport at night or in foul weather. The primary system developed for this was the Lorenz system, developed by Johannes Plendl, which was in the process of being widely deployed on large civilian and military aircraft.

The Lorenz system worked by feeding a special three-element antenna system with a modulated radio signal. The signal was fed to the centre dipole, which had a slightly longer reflector element on either side set slightly back. A switch rapidly alternated the opened midpoint connection of each reflector in turn, sending the beam slightly to the left and then slightly to the right of the centreline of the runway. The beams widened as they spread from the antennas, so there was an area directly off the runway approach where the two signals overlapped. The switch was timed so it spent longer on the right side of the antenna than the left.

An aircraft approaching the airport would tune one of their radios to the Lorenz frequency. If the crew was on the left side of the centreline, they would hear a series of short tones followed by long pauses, meaning the aircraft was on the "dot" side of the antenna. Hearing the "dots", they would know that they had to veer to the right to fly down the centreline. If the crew was on the right side of the centerline, they would hear a series of long tones followed by short pauses, meaning the aircraft was on the "dash" side of the antenna. Hearing the "dashes", they would know that they had to veer to the left to fly down the centreline. In the centre, the radio would receive both signals, where the dots filled in the gaps in the dashes and produced a continual signal, the so-called "equisignal". Flying in the known direction of the runway and keeping the equisignal on the radio, Lorenz-equipped crews could guide an aircraft down a straight line with a relatively high degree of accuracy, so much so that pilots could then find the runway visually except in the worst conditions.

== Night bombing ==
During the early 1930s, the concept of a night bombing strategic campaign began to become paramount in military aviation circles. This was due to the ever-increasing performance of bombers, which were beginning to have the capability to strike across Europe with useful bomb loads. These aircraft were slow and lumbering, easy prey for interceptors, but this threat could be essentially eliminated by flying at night. A bomber, painted black, could be spotted only at very short ranges. As the bomber's altitude and speed increased, the threat from ground-based defences was greatly reduced. Planners believed that "the bomber will always get through".

The problem with night bombing is that the same limitations in visibility meant the bomb crew would have a difficult time finding their targets, especially a blacked-out target at night. Only the largest targets, cities, could be attacked with any probability of success.

To support this mission, the RAF invested heavily in navigation training, equipping their aircraft with various devices, including an astrodome for taking a star fix and giving the navigator room to do his calculations in an illuminated workspace. This system was put to use as soon as the war began and was initially regarded as successful. In reality, the early bombing effort was a complete failure, with the majority of bombs landing miles from their intended targets.

The Luftwaffe continued to research accurate night bombing against smaller targets. Not depending on celestial navigation, they invested their efforts in radio navigation systems. The Luftwaffe concentrated on developing a bombing direction system based on the Lorenz concept through the 1930s, as it made night navigation relatively easy by simply listening for signals on a radio set, and the necessary radios were already being installed on many aircraft.

== German systems ==
=== Knickebein ===
Map of Knickebein transmitters

For bombing use, the modifications to Lorenz were fairly minor. Much larger antennas were needed to provide the required accuracy. This was achieved by using aerials with many more elements, but it retained the simple switching of two of the reflector elements to alter the beam directions very marginally. The beam angles were so dramatically reduced that it was only a few tens of yards wide over the target. It was the shape of the aerials that gave the system its code name, Knickebein, which means "crooked leg". (Note: pronounced [ˈknɪkəˌbaɪ̯n]; 'bent leg' is the literal translation. An English speaker would use the phrase 'crooked leg' rather than 'bent leg'.) The word is also the name of a magical raven in Germanic mythology. For the required range, transmitted power was increased considerably. The Knickebein receivers were disguised as a standard blind landing receiver system, consisting apparently of the EBL-1 and the EBL-2 receivers.

The beam from a single transmitter would guide the bombers towards the target, but could not tell them when they were over it. To add this ranging feature, a second transmitter similar to the first was set up so its beam crossed the guidance beam at the point where the bombs should be dropped. The aerials could be rotated to make the beams from two transmitters cross over the target. The bombers would fly into the beam of one and ride it until they started hearing the tones from the other (on a second receiver). When the steady "on course" sound was heard from the second beam, they dropped their bombs.

Later, smaller Knickebein antenna

The first of these new Knickebein transmitters was set up in 1939 on Stollberg hill in Nordfriesland near the border with Denmark; at Kleve (Cleves) near the Dutch border, almost the most westerly point in Germany, and at Lörrach near the border with France and Switzerland in south-western Germany. Following the fall of France in June 1940, additional transmitters were installed on the French coast. Stations were also constructed in Norway and the Netherlands.

Knickebein were used in the early stages of the German night-bombing offensive and proved to be fairly effective, but the tactics for using the system in a widespread bombing effort were not yet developed, so much of the early German night bombing offensive was limited to area bombing.

==== Knickebein countermeasures ====
Efforts in Britain to block the Knickebein system required time. Air Ministry Intelligence, led by R. V. Jones, became aware of the system when the Royal Aircraft Establishment analysed a shot down German bomber carrying the Lorenz system and observed it was far more sensitive than required for a mere landing aid. Secretly recorded transcripts from German prisoner of war pilots indicated this may have been a bomb aiming aid. Winston Churchill had also been given Ultra intelligence from decrypted Enigma messages that mentioned 'bombing beams'.

When Jones mentioned the possibility of bombing beams to Churchill, he ordered further investigation. The British code-named the system Headache. Many in the Air Ministry did not believe that the system was in use. Frederick Lindemann, leading scientific adviser to the government, argued that any such system would not be able to follow the curvature of the Earth, although Thomas Eckersley of the Marconi company had said it could.

Eckersley's assertion was demonstrated after Churchill ordered a flight to try to detect the beams. The RAF lacked equipment capable of detecting 30–33 MHz Lorenz signals and bought an American Hallicrafters S-27 amateur radio receiver from a shop in Lisle Street, London. The receiver was fitted into an Avro Anson and operated by a member of the Y Service. The flight was nearly cancelled when Eckersley withdrew his assertion that the beams would bend around the Earth. Jones saved the flight by pointing out that Churchill had ordered it, and he would make sure that the Prime Minister would learn who cancelled it.

The crew were told to search for radio signals around 30 MHz having Lorenz characteristics and if they found any, to determine their bearing. The flight took off and eventually flew into the beam from Kleve on 31.5 MHz. It located the cross beam from Stollberg (its origin was unknown prior to this flight). The radio operator and navigator were able to plot the path of the beams and discovered that they intersected above the Rolls-Royce engine factory at Derby, the only factory producing the Merlin engine. It was realised that the argument over whether the beams would bend around the Earth was academic, as the transmitters were more or less in line-of-sight to aircraft at high altitude. British sceptics claimed that the system was proof that the German pilots were not as good as their own, who they believed could do without such systems. The Butt Report proved this to be wrong, aerial reconnaissance returned photographs of the RAF bombing raids, showing that they were rarely, if ever, anywhere near their targets.

==== Aspirin ====
Efforts to block the Knickebein headache were code named Aspirin. Initially, modified medical diathermy sets transmitted interference. Later, local radio transmitters broadcast an extra "dot signal" at low power on nights where raids were expected. The German practice of turning on the beams long before the bombers reached the target area aided the British efforts. Ansons fitted with receivers would be flown around the country to find the beams' location to be reported to nearby broadcasters.

The low-power "dot signal" was transmitted randomly at first, so German navigators would hear two dots. This meant there were many equisignal areas, and no easy way to distinguish them except by comparing them with a known location. The British transmitters were later modified to send their dots at the same time as the German transmitters, making it impossible to tell which signal was which. In this case the navigators would receive the equisignal over a wide area and navigation along the bomb line became impossible, with the aircraft drifting into the "dash area" and no way to correct for it.

The beam was seemingly "bent" away from the target. Eventually, the beams could be inclined by a controlled amount which enabled the British to fool the Germans into dropping their bombs where they wanted them. A side effect was that as the German crews had been trained to navigate solely by the beams, many crews failed to find either the true equisignal or Germany again. Some Luftwaffe bombers even landed at RAF bases, believing they had returned.

=== X-Gerät ===
Principle of the German night navigation and target-finding system X-Gerät for night bombing

As good as Knickebein was, it was never intended to be used in the long-range role. Plendl had been working for some time to produce a much more accurate version of the same basic concept, which was eventually delivered as X-Gerät (X-Apparatus). X-Gerät used a series of beams to locate the target, each beam named after a river. The main beam, Weser, was similar in concept to the one used in Knickebein but operated at a much higher frequency. Due to the nature of radio propagation, this allowed its two beams to be pointed much more accurately than Knickebein from a similarly sized antenna; the equi-signal area was only about 100 yards (91 m) wide at a distance of 200 miles (320 km) from the antenna. The beams were so narrow that bombers could not find them without help, so a low-power wide-beam version of Knickebein was set up at the same station to act as a guide. The main Weser antenna was set up just to the west of Cherbourg in France.

The "cross" signal in X-Gerät used a series of three very narrow single beams, Rhine, Oder and Elbe. They were carefully aimed to define a precise bomb release trajectory. First a bomb release point along Weser was determined, by calculating the range or distance the bombs would travel between release and impact, and picking a point at that range to target. The Elbe beam intersected Weser 5 kilometres (3.1 mi) before the release point. The Oder beam intersected Weser 10 kilometres (6.2 mi) before the release point, or 5 kilometres (3.1 mi) before Elbe. Rhine did not require the same precision and was approximately 30 kilometres (18.6 mi) before the release point. The beams' width added a small error to the intersection coordinates, on the order of tens to hundreds of meters.

As the bomber followed the Weser beam and reached Rhine, the radio operator heard a brief signal and set up his equipment. This consisted of a special stop-clock with two hands. When the Oder signal was received the clock automatically started and the two hands simultaneously swept up from zero. When the Elbe signal was received, one hand stopped and the other reversed, sweeping back towards zero. The stopped hand indicated an accurate measurement of travel time from Oder to Elbe. Since the Oder to Elbe distance equalled the Elbe to release point distance, a bomber flying at constant speed arrived at the release point as the moving hand reached zero, when the bombs were automatically released.

X-Gerät operated at a much higher frequency than Knickebein (around 60 MHz) and thus required the use of new radio equipment. There was not enough equipment to fit all bombers, so the experimental unit Kampfgruppe 100 (KGr 100) was given the task of using their X-Gerät equipment to guide other aircraft to the target. To do this, KGr 100 aircraft would attack as a small group first, dropping flares which other aircraft would then see and bomb visually. This is the first use of the pathfinder concept that the RAF improved to great effect against the Germans some three years later.

The system was first tested on 20 December 1939 when a bomber from KGr 100 flown by Oberleutnant Hermann Schmidt flew over London at 7,000m (23,000 ft).

X-Gerät was used effectively in a series of raids known to the Germans as Moonlight Sonata, against Coventry, Wolverhampton and Birmingham. In the raid on Birmingham only KGr 100 was used and British post-raid analysis showed that the vast majority of the bombs dropped were placed within 100 yards (91 m) of the mid-line of the Weser beam, spread along it for a few hundred yards. This was the sort of accuracy that even daytime bombing could rarely achieve. The raid on Coventry with full support from other units dropping on their flares almost destroyed the city centre.

==== X-Gerät countermeasures ====
X-Gerät proved more difficult to stop than Knickebein. Initial defences against the system were deployed in a similar fashion to Knickebein in an attempt to disrupt the Coventry raid but proved to be a failure. Although Jones had correctly guessed the beam layout (and acknowledges it was only a guess), the modulation frequency had been measured incorrectly as 1,500 Hz, but was in fact 2,000 Hz. At the time it was believed that this would not make any difference, as the tones were close enough that an operator would have a hard time distinguishing them in a noisy aircraft.

The mystery was eventually revealed after an X-Gerät-equipped Heinkel He 111 crashed on 6 November 1940 on the English coast at West Bay, Bridport. Although the aircraft sank during the recovery operation, the waterlogged X-Gerät equipment was recovered. On examination, it was learned that a new instrument was being used that automatically decoded the dots and dashes and moved a pointer on a display in the cockpit in front of the pilot. This device was fitted with a very sharp filter which was sensitive only at 2,000 Hz, and not to the early British 1,500 Hz counter-signals. While the jammers were modified accordingly, this came too late for the raid on Coventry on 14 November; but the modified jammers were able to successfully disrupt a raid on Birmingham on 19 November.

X-Gerät was eventually defeated in another manner, by way of a "false Elbe" which was set up to cross the 'Weser' guide beam at a mere 1 kilometre (0.6 mi) after the Oder beam –much earlier than the expected 5 kilometres (3.1 mi). Since the final stages of the release were automatic, the clock would reverse prematurely and drop the bombs kilometres short of the target. Setting up this false beam proved very difficult as the Germans, learning from their mistakes with Knickebein, did not switch the X-Gerät beams on until as late as possible, making it much more difficult to arrange the "false Elbe" in time.

=== Y-Gerät ===
As the British slowly gained the upper hand in the Battle of the Beams, they started considering what the next German system would entail. Since Germany's current approaches had been rendered useless, an entirely new system would have to be developed. Jones believed that if they could defeat this system quickly, the Germans might give up on the entire concept.

British monitors soon started receiving intelligence from Enigma decrypts referring to a new device known as Y-Gerät, which was also sometimes referred to as Wotan. Jones had already concluded the Germans used code names that were too descriptive, so he asked a specialist in the German language and literature at Bletchley Park about the word Wotan. The specialist realised Wotan referred to Wōden, a one-eyed god, and might refer to a single-beam navigation system. Jones agreed, and knew that a system with one beam would have to include a distance-measurement system. He concluded that it might work on the basis described by the anti-Nazi German mathematician and physicist Hans Mayer, who while visiting Norway had provided a large amount of information in what is now known as the Oslo Report. (Note: The information in this report was plentiful and seemingly far too useful to be true, and many considered it to be a German disinformation campaign. The Oslo Report's description of Wotan was accurate, however and the report was later realised to be "for real".)

Y-Gerät used a single narrow beam pointed over the target, similar to earlier beam systems, transmitting a modulated radio signal. The system used a transponder (FuG 28a) that received the signal from the beam and immediately re-transmitted it to the ground station. The ground station listened for the return signal and compared the phase of its modulation to the transmitted signal, which accurately determined the transit time of the signal, and hence the distance to the aircraft. Coupled with the direction of the beam (adjusted for a maximum return signal), the bomber's position could be established with considerable accuracy. The bombers did not have to track the beam, instead the ground controllers could calculate it and then give radio instructions to the pilot to correct the flight path.

Jones later learned that his guess on the operating principle based on the name Wotan was entirely by luck. Later documents showed that the original X-Gerät was known as Wotan I, and the Y-Gerät as Wotan II. Had he known the name was also associated with X-Gerät it was unlikely he would have concluded the system used a single beam.

==== Y-Gerät countermeasures ====
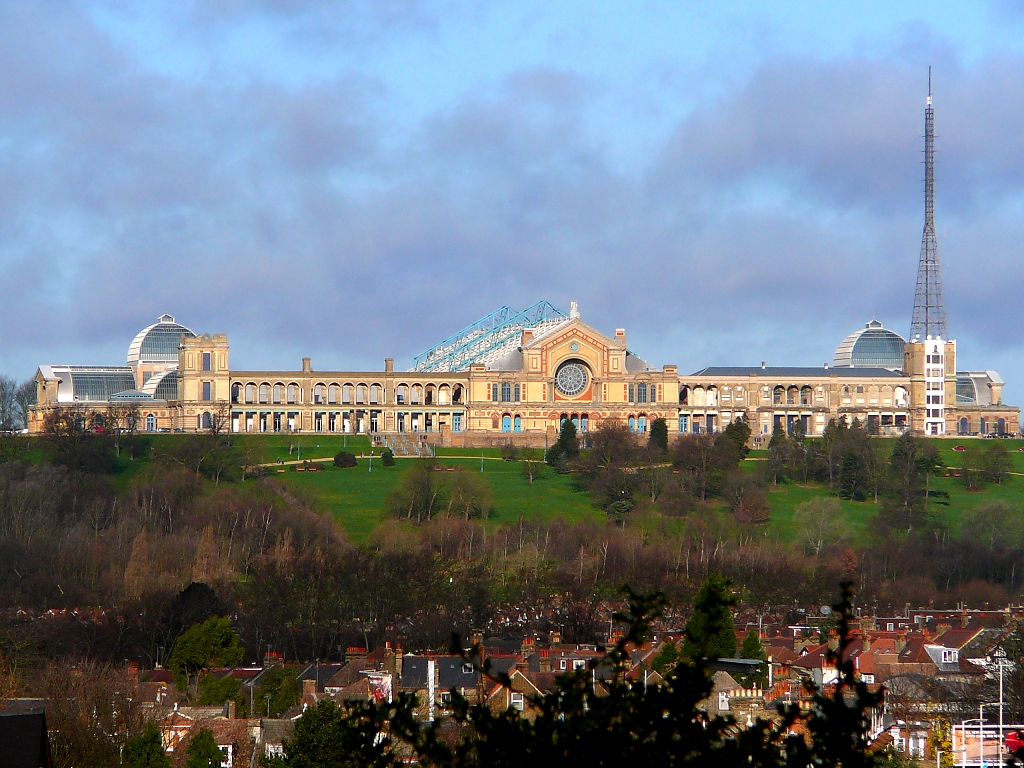
Alexandra Palace in north London

The British were ready for this system even before it was used. By chance, the Germans had chosen the operating frequency of the Wotan system badly. It operated at 45 MHz, which happened to be the frequency of the powerful, but dormant, BBC television transmitter at Alexandra Palace. All Jones had to do was arrange for the return signal to be received from the aircraft and then sent to Alexandra Palace for re-transmission. The combination of the two signals modified the phase shift, and thus the apparent transit delay. Initially, the signal was re-transmitted at low power, not powerful enough for the Germans to realise what was happening, but enough to spoil the accuracy of the system. Over subsequent nights, the transmitter power was gradually increased.

As Y-Gerät's use went on, the aircrew accused the ground station of sending bad signals and the ground station alleged the aircraft had loose connections. The whole scheme appealed to Jones as he was a natural practical joker and remarked that he was able to play one of the largest practical jokes with virtually any national resource that he required. The gradually increasing power conditioned the Germans such they did not realise that the system was being interfered with, but believed that it suffered several inherent defects. Eventually, as the power was increased enough, the whole Y-Gerät system started to ring with all the feedback. The Luftwaffe, finally realising that it had been sabotaged by the British from the first day that the system was used operationally, lost faith in electronic navigation aids as the British had predicted and did not deploy another system against Great Britain, although by this time Hitler's attention was turning towards Eastern Europe.

== See also ==
- Belfast Blitz
- Chain Home
- GEE, the early war RAF navigation system for night bombing
- Kammhuber Line
- List of World War II electronic warfare equipment
- Oboe, the December 1941-launched successor to GEE for RAF night bomber raids.
