= Height above average terrain =

Height based on large area surrounding object; often used in U.S. for antenna towers

Height above average terrain (HAAT), or (less popularly) effective height above average terrain (EHAAT), is the vertical position of an antenna site above the surrounding landscape. HAAT is used extensively in FM radio and television, as it is more important than effective radiated power (ERP) in determining the range of broadcasts (VHF and UHF in particular, as they are line of sight transmissions). For international coordination, it is officially measured in meters, even by the Federal Communications Commission in the United States, as Canada and Mexico have extensive border zones where stations can be received on either side of the international boundaries. Stations that want to increase above a certain HAAT must reduce their power accordingly, based on the maximum distance their station class is allowed to cover (see List of North American broadcast station classes for more information on this).

The FCC procedure to calculate HAAT is: from the proposed or actual antenna site, either 12 or 16 radials are drawn, and points at 2, 4, 6, 8, and 10 miles (16 km) radius along each radial were used. The entire radial graph could be rotated to achieve the best effect for the station. The altitude of the antenna site, minus the average altitude of all the specified points, is the HAAT. This can create some unusual cases, particularly in mountainous regions—it is possible to have a negative number for HAAT (the transmitter would not be located underground, but rather in a valley, with hills on both sides taller than the transmitter itself, for example).

The FCC has divided the Contiguous United States into three zones for the determination of spacing between FM and TV stations using the same frequencies. FM and TV stations are assigned maximum ERP and HAAT values, depending on their assigned zones, to prevent co-channel interference.

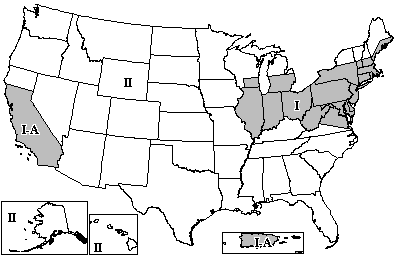
FM broadcast zones in the U.S.

The FCC regulations for ERP and HAAT are listed under Title 47, Part 73 of the Code of Federal Regulations (CFR).

== FM ==
=== Zones I and I-A ===
- Maximum HAAT: 150 metres (492 ft 2 in)
- Maximum ERP: 50 kilowatts (47dBW)
- Minimum co-channel separation: 241 km (150 mi)

=== Zones II and III ===
- Maximum HAAT: 600 metres (1,968 ft 6 in)
- Maximum ERP: 100 kilowatts (50dBW)
- Minimum co-channel separation: 290 km (180 mi).

== TV ==
In all zones, maximum ERP for analog TV transmitters is as follows:

- VHF 2-6: 100 kilowatts (50dBW) (analog); 45 kilowatts (46.5dBW) (digital)
- VHF 7-13: 316 kilowatts (55dBW) (analog); 160 kilowatts (52dBW) (digital)
- UHF: 5,000 kilowatts (67dBW) (analog); 1,000 kilowatts (60dBW) (digital)

=== Maximum HAAT ===
- Zone I: 305 metres (1,000 ft 8 in)
- Zones II and III: 610 metres (2,001 ft 4 in)

=== Minimum co-channel separation ===
Band	Zone I	Zone II	Zone III
VHF	272.7 km (169.5 miles)	304.9 km (189.5 miles)	353.2 km (219.5 miles)
UHF	248.6 km (154.5 miles)	280.8 km (174.5 miles)	329.0 km (204.5 miles)

== Zone layouts ==
Zone I (the most densely populated zone) consists of the entire land masses of the following states: Connecticut, Delaware, Illinois, Indiana, Maryland, Massachusetts, New Jersey, Ohio, Pennsylvania, Rhode Island, and West Virginia; in addition to the northern and eastern portions of Virginia; the areas of Michigan and southeastern Wisconsin south of 43° 30' north latitude; the coastal strip of Maine; the areas of New Hampshire and Vermont south of 45° north latitude; and the areas of western New York south of 43° 30' north latitude and eastern New York south of 45° north latitude. In addition, Zone I-A (FM only) consists of all of California south of 40° north latitude, Puerto Rico and the U.S. Virgin Islands (If the dividing line between Zones I and II runs through a city, that city is considered to be in Zone I.).

Zones I and I-A have the most "grandfathered" overpowered stations, which are allowed the same extended coverage areas that they had before the zones were established. One of the most powerful of these stations is WBCT in Grand Rapids, Michigan, which operates at 320,000 watts and 238 meters (781 ft) HAAT.

Zone III (the zone with the flattest terrain) consists of all of Florida and the areas of Alabama, Georgia, Louisiana, Mississippi, and Texas within approximately 241.4 kilometers (150.0 mi) of the Gulf of Mexico.

Zone II is all the rest of the Continental United States, Alaska and Hawaii.

== See also ==
- Above mean sea level (AMSL)
- Above ground level (AGL)
- Canadian Radio-television and Telecommunications Commission (CRTC)
- List of broadcast station classes
- Topographic prominence – a similar measurement for mountains
