= R. V. Jones Intelligence Award =

The R. V. Jones Intelligence Award was created by the CIA in 1993 to honour those whose accomplishments mirror in substance and style those of R. V. Jones, to wit: "Scientific acumen applied with art in the cause of freedom". Jones thus became the first recipient.

== Recipients of the R. V. Jones Intelligence Award ==
- 1999 – William J. Perry, former US Secretary of Defense
- 1996 – Richard L. Garwin, scientist
- 1994 – Albert D. Wheelon, former deputy director for Science and Technology, CIA
- 1993 – R. V. Jones
