= Stollberg (North Frisia) =

Coordinates: 54°38′40″N 8°56′40″E

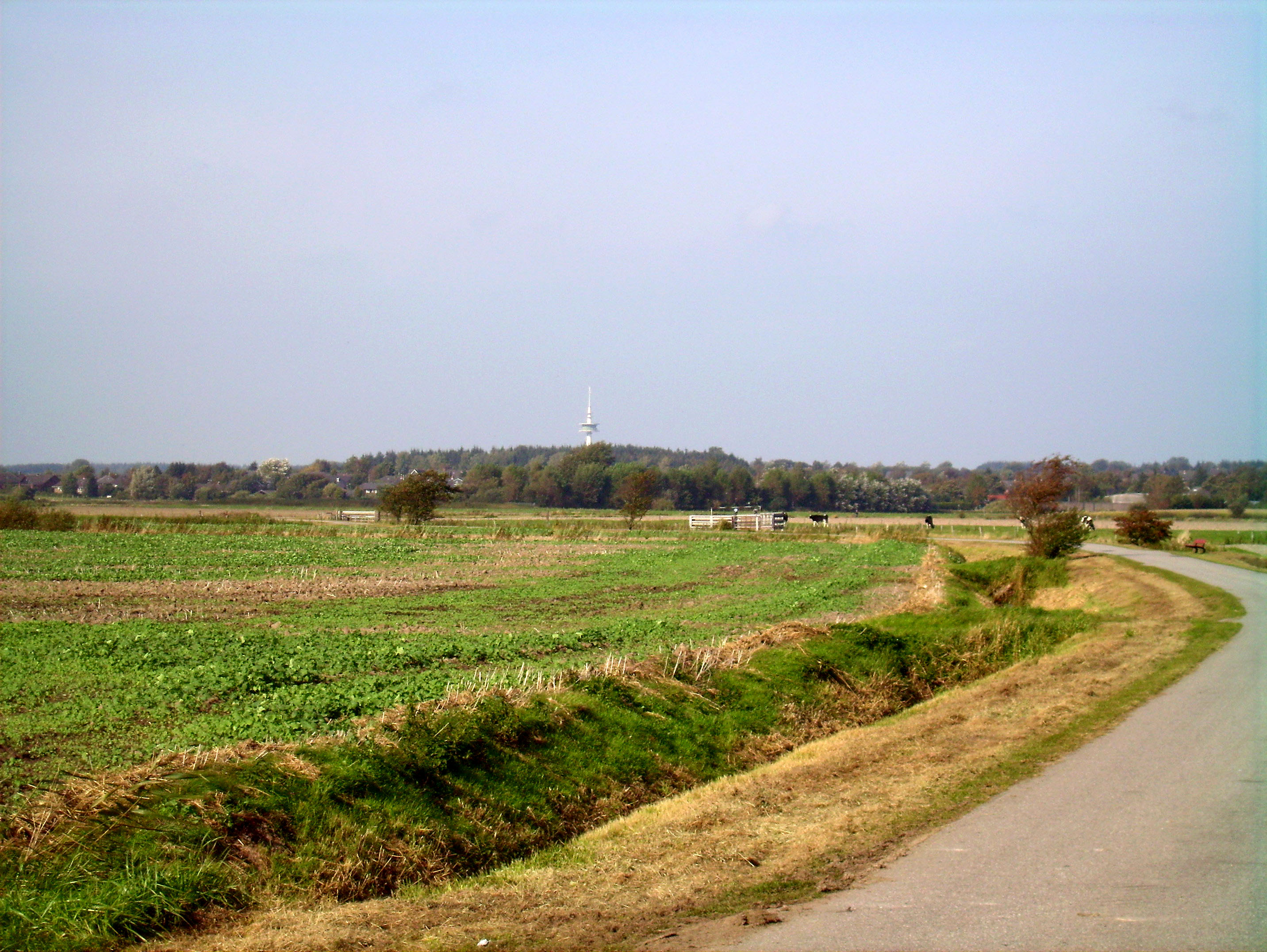
View of the Stollberg from Bredstedter Koog

At 43.4 metres above sea level, the Stollberg (German pronunciation: [ˈʃtɔlˌbɛʁk], Danish: Stolbjerg) is the fourth highest hill in the district of North Frisia in northern Germany, after the Sandesberg near Ostenfeld (53.3 m), the Uwe Düne in the municipality of Kampen auf Sylt (50.2 m) and the Rantzauhöhe within the Langenberg south of the village of Leck (44.8 m). It is part of the geest ridge that runs westwards and was created as a so-called old moraine during the Saale glaciation and was subsequently shaped during the Weichselian glaciation. From the top of the Stollberg there is a good view over the surrounding area, both near and far. The Stollberg belongs to the municipality of Bordelum and lies immediately next to the B 5 federal road.

In the vicinity of the hill is the Stollberg spring, which was considered holy in earlier times.

In April 2002 the Ministry for the Environment, Nature and Forests in the state of Schleswig-Holstein declared the area as a nature experience site (Naturerlebnisraum).

On the Stollberg is a 139-metre-high (456 ft) transmission tower (standard tower) belonging to Deutsche Telekom.

== See also ==
- Battle of the Beams - during the early stages of the Second World War, the hill was the location of a Knickebein. A German radio direction antenna used by Luftwaffe bombers for attacks against the United Kingdom.
