= Hans Ferdinand Mayer =

German mathematician and physicist (1895–1980)

- Born: 23 October 1895; Pforzheim, Baden, Germany
- Died: 18 October 1980 (aged 84); Munich, Bavaria, West Germany
- Education: University of Heidelberg
- Occupations: Mathematician; Physicist
- Years active: 1920–62
- Employer: Siemens & Halske (1922–43 / 1950–62)
- Known for: Writing the "Oslo Report"

Hans Ferdinand Mayer (born 23 October 1895 in Pforzheim, Germany; died 18 October 1980 in Munich, West Germany) was a German mathematician and physicist. He was the author of the "Oslo Report", a major military intelligence leak which revealed German technological secrets to the British Government shortly after the start of World War II.

== Biography ==
Hailing from a modest background, Mayer volunteered for service in WWI where he was severely wounded on his 19th birthday. He subsequently studied mathematics, physics and astronomy at the University of Karlsruhe and the University of Heidelberg. In 1920, he attained a doctorate "on the behaviour of molecules in relation to free slow electrons". His professor was Nobel Prize winner Philipp Lenard. In 1922 he joined the Berlin laboratory of Siemens & Halske AG. From 1926 he co-operated with Karl Küpfmüller. Both scientists concerned themselves with interference-free information transfer in long distance circuits, important in developing telecommunications. In 1936 Mayer became the Director of the Siemens Research Laboratory in Berlin.

In 1943 he was arrested for political reasons (listening to the BBC, and criticism of the Nazi regime), although the Nazis never knew of the existence of the Oslo Report. He was saved from execution by the intervention of his doctoral supervisor Lenard, ironically an ardent Nazi supporter. He was first interned in Dachau, then in four other concentration camps until the end of the war. Johannes Plendl also played a role in his survival in the camps, by appointing Mayer to head a radio laboratory, although Mayer had no experience in radio.

After WWII Mayer, along with other German scientists, went to the USA as part of Operation Paperclip. Initially he worked in the U.S. Air Force’s primary research laboratory at Wright-Patterson Air Force Base, Dayton, Ohio. In 1947 he moved to Cornell University, as a Professor of Electrical Engineering. In 1950 he returned to Germany, where he was head of the Siemens & Halske research department for communications technology in Munich until 1962.

== Oslo Report ==
Hans Ferdinand Mayer was the author of the Oslo Report, one of the most serious breaches of German security in World War II. He signed it as "a German scientist, who is on your side", before sending it to the British Embassy in Oslo, Norway, in early November 1939. In his position at Siemens he had access to a wide range of information regarding the development and application of electronics in current and future weapons systems and radar.

The breadth (and uneven quality) of information in his Report led to initial scepticism amongst the British intelligence community about its veracity, but the technical detail of the information concerning electronics caught the attention of Dr. R.V. Jones, a brilliant young scientist who had recently been appointed to the Air Ministry. Jones, who was highly regarded by Winston Churchill and eventually rose to the position of Assistant Director of Intelligence (Science), found the Oslo Report extremely useful in anticipating and countering the deployment of new German radar systems, and the radio beam systems used to guide German bombers to their targets.

The existence of the Oslo Report became more widely known through a talk given by Jones in 1947, although he did not become aware of its author's identity until late 1953, finally confirming it by meeting Mayer in 1955. Jones agreed to keep Mayer's identity secret, to avoid possible retribution against Mayer and his family.

Mayer did not tell his own family until 1977 that he had written the Oslo Report. His will was written so that his authorship of the Report would only be published after the death of himself and his wife. Jones respected Mayer's wishes, not revealing his identity until 1989.

== Works ==
Hans Ferdinand Mayer published some 25 technical articles and held more than 80 patents.

In November 1926, Mayer published an article (H. F. Mayer. "On the equivalent-circuit scheme of the amplifier tube". Telegraph and Telephony, 15:335-337, 1926) which describes the transformation of spare voltage supplies after equivalent current sources. It is an extension of Thévenin's theorem stating that any collection of voltage sources and resistors with two terminals is electrically equivalent to an ideal current source. Edward Lawry Norton likewise described this in 1926 in an internal report for Bell Labs. The theorem is well-known under the name Norton's theorem or Mayer-Norton theorem.

== Honours ==
- Honorary doctorate at the Technical University of Stuttgart (1956)
- Gauss-Weber-Medaille from the University of Goettingen
- Philipp-Reis-Preis from Deutsche Post (1961)
- Ehrenring from the VDE (1968)

== Sources ==
- Don H. Johnson: Scanning Our Past - Origins OF the Equivalent Circuit Concept: The Current SOURCE Equivalent , 2002 PROCEEDINGS OF THE IEEE, VOLUME. 91, NO. 5, MAY 2003
- Jones, R. V., 1989, Reflections on Intelligence, London: Heinemann.
