= Broadcast range =

Service area for radio transmission

A broadcast range (also listening range or listening area for radio, or viewing range or viewing area for television) is the service area that a broadcast station or other transmission covers via radio waves (or possibly infrared light, which is closely related). It is generally the area in which a station's signal strength is sufficient for most receivers to decode it. However, this also depends on interference from other stations.

== Legal definitions ==
The "primary service area" is the area served by a station's strongest signal. According to Federal Communications Commission (FCC) regulations, the "city-grade contour" is 70 dBμ (decibels relative to one microvolt per meter of signal strength) or 3.16mV/m (millivolts per meter) for FM stations in the United States. This is also significant in broadcast law, in that a station must cover its city of license within this area, except for non-commercial educational and low-power stations.

The legally protected range of a station extends beyond this range, out to the point where signal strength is expected to be 1mV/m for most stations in North America, though for class B1 stations it is 0.7mV/m, and as low as 0.5mV/m for full class B stations (the maximum allowed in densely populated areas of both Canada and the U.S.).

== Practical application ==
In reality, radio propagation changes along with the weather and tropospheric ducting, and occasionally along with other upper-atmospheric phenomena like sunspots and even meteor showers. Thus, while a broadcasting authority might fix the range to an area with exact boundaries (defined as a series of vectors), this is rarely if ever true. When a broadcast reaches well outside of its intended range due to unusual conditions, DXing is possible.

The local terrain can also play a major role in limiting broadcast range. Mountain ranges block FM broadcasts, AM broadcasts, and TV broadcasts, and other signals in the VHF and especially UHF ranges, respectively. This terrain shielding occurs when the line of sight is blocked by something through which the radio waves cannot pass, particularly stone. At times this may be moot due to weather, such as when the tall cumulonimbus clouds of a squall line of thunderstorms reflect the signal over the top, like an extremely tall radio tower. Conversely, heavy rain may attenuate the range of even local stations. ATSC digital television is affected by wind and trees (even if not surrounding the transmitter or receiver locations), apparently related to its use of 8VSB modulation instead of COFDM.

AM broadcasting stations have different issues, due to using the mediumwave band. Broadcast range in these stations is determined by ground conductivity, and the proper use and maintenance of grounding radials which act as a ground plane for the mast radiators used. Skywaves reflect off the ionosphere at a much greater distance above Earth's surface at night. This in turn causes mediumwave, most shortwave, and even longwave stations to travel much further at night, which is the side of the Earth where the solar wind pulls the ionosphere (and magnetosphere) away from the planet, instead of pushing toward it as on the day side. Because of this, many AM stations must cut power or go off-air at night, except for the very earliest stations still grandfathered on clear channels. Border blaster stations in northern Mexico also used this effect, along with very high-power transmitters, to extend their nighttime broadcast ranges well over the US/Mexico border and across most of the United States.

Various broadcast relay stations can help to extend a station's area by retransmitting them on the same or another channel. What is usually called a repeater in amateur radio is called a broadcast translator (different channel) or booster (same channel) in American broadcasting, or the much broader category or rebroadcasters in Canadian broadcasting (which includes more than just the low-power broadcasting used in the U.S.) Boosters are used only within the broadcast range of the parent station, and serve the same function locally as regional and national single-frequency networks do in Europe. Distributed transmission has also undergone tests in the U.S., but to preserve stations' market share in their home media markets, these will be limited to the broadcast area of a single large station. Satellite radio, which is designed for use without a dish, also uses ground repeaters in large cities due to the many obstructions their high-rise buildings cause to the many current and potential customers that are concentrated there.

== Edge-of-range issues ==
Those at the edge of a station's broadcast range will typically notice static in an analog broadcast, while error correction will keep a digital signal clear until it hits the cliff effect and suddenly disappears completely. FM stations may flip back and forth (sometimes annoyingly rapidly when moving) due to the capture effect, while AM stations (including TV video) may overlay or fade with each other.

FM stereo will tend to get static more quickly than the monophonic sound due to its use of subcarriers, so stations may choose to extend the usable part of their range by disabling the stereo generator. Listeners can also choose to disable stereo decoding on the receiver, though loss of the stereo pilot tone causes this to happen automatically. Because this tends to turn on and off when at the threshold of reception, and the threshold is often set too low by the manufacturer's product design, manually disabling this when at the edge of the broadcast range prevents the annoying noisy-stereo/quiet-mono switching.

The same is true of analog TV stereo and second audio programs, and even for color TV, all of which use subcarriers. Radio reading services and other subcarrier services will also tend to suffer from dropouts sooner than the main station.

Technologies are available that allow for switching to a different signal carrying the same radio program when leaving the broadcast range of a station. Radio Data System allows for switching to a different FM or station with the same identifier, or even to (but not necessarily from) an AM station. Satellite radio also is designed to switch seamlessly between repeaters and/or satellite when moving outside the range of one or the other. HD Radio switches back to the analog signal as a fallback when the edge of the digital range is encountered, but the success of this from the listener's perspective depends on how well the station's broadcast engineer has synchronized the two.

== Digital versus analog ==
Digital transmissions require less power to be received clearly than analog ones. The exact figure for various modes depends on how robust the signal is made to begin with, such as modulation, guard interval, and forward error correction. In each of these three factors, the caveat is that a higher data signaling rate means a tradeoff with reduced broadcast range. The hierarchical modulation used on DVB is a unique case, which reduces the range of the full-definition signal, in exchange for an increase in the usable range of the lower-definition part of the video.

Digital stations in North America usually are operated by the same groups as the analog side, and thus operate their own independent facilities. Because of this, the FCC requires U.S. TV stations to replicate their analog coverage with their digital signal as well. However, ATSC digital TV only requires about one-fifth the amount of power to reach the same area on the same channel as analog does. For HD Radio, the figure is only one percent of the station's analog wattage, in part because it is an in-band on-channel method, which uses sidebands that must prevent interference to adjacent channels, especially for older or cheaper receivers which have insufficient sensitivity and/or selectivity.
