= Salford Electrical Instruments =

British manufacturer of electrical instruments

Salford Electrical Instruments Ltd
- Industry: Electronics
- Founded: 1910
- Defunct: 1993
- Fate: Reabsorbed by General Electric Company
- Headquarters: Salford, England
- Area served: Worldwide
- Products: Electrical testing equipment, measurement instruments

Salford Electrical Instruments Ltd (SEI; colloquially: Salford Elec) was a British manufacturer of electrical measurement and testing instruments based in Salford, England. Closely tied to the General Electric Company (GEC) conglomerate, the company was well-established in the electrical equipment industry in the United Kingdom in the 20th century.

== History ==
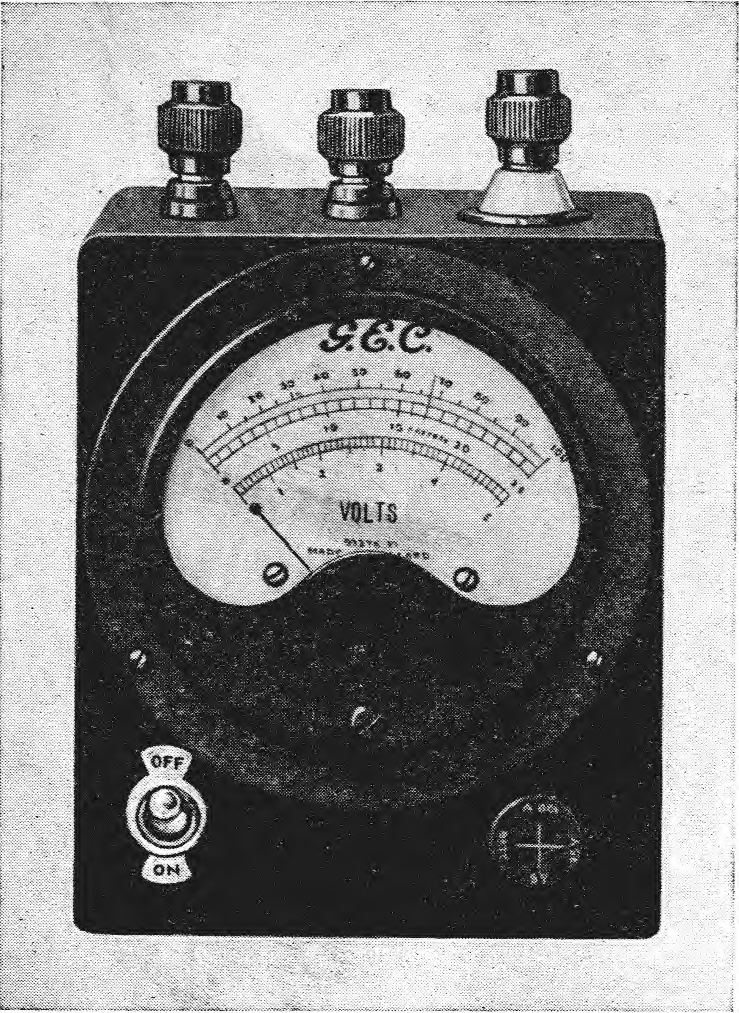
Miniature valve voltmeter made by SEI, advertised in The Post Office Electrical Engineers' Journal, 1937

In 1910, the meter department of GEC was incorporated separately as Salford Electrical Instruments Ltd, a subsidiary company employing 1,000 workers. Since 1905, the department had been based at Bow Street Works, a small two-storey building at the rear of GEC's large Peel Works on Silk Street. In around 1921, it expanded to fill the whole Peel Works, after the departure of GEC's Peel-Conner Telephone Works to Coventry, and the extension of the site to accommodate a new factory.

SEI's managing director, Henry Cobden Turner, is known for his work on the radio proximity fuse, an important innovation during the Second World War. The device was manufactured at the Salford works, and was over 90% successful in disrupting German flying bombs such as the V-1 and V-2 in mid-air, significantly reducing civilian casualties. The company was also active in the development of radar technology, with early experiments conducted from the roof at Silk Street, tracking vehicles on nearby streets.

By the 1960s, Salford Electrical Instruments was primarily focused on assembling electronic measuring instruments. After a partial floor collapse in the Silk Street factory in March 1965, the company relocated to Barton Lane in Eccles, taking over the four-acre site of the former Jonex Mills. Here, the company produced electrical components such as capacitors, thermostats, telecommunications equipment, rectifiers, and potentiometers. SEI also opened a factory in Heywood, Greater Manchester. At its peak, SEI employed 3,000 people over 7 factories.

=== Decline ===
The Eccles factory closed in the early 1980s. The site was subsequently redeveloped into an industrial estate. The company suffered from financial problems in the early 1990s, leading it to sell its magnetic materials division to Neoside Limited and its mining product business to Rowe Hankins Components Ltd in 1993, while the crystals division was sold to Plessey.

On 22 December 1993, the remaining assets were transferred to GEC, and the company ceased to operate independently. In Heywood, local Member of Parliament Jim Callaghan unsuccessfully appealed to Lord Weinstock, the managing director of GEC, to retain the factory, saying its closure would result in the loss of 362 jobs. In 1999, GEC merged with British Aerospace to form BAE Systems, and Salford Electrical Instruments became part of this larger entity.

== Products ==
Salford Electrical Instruments had a diverse industrial product portfolio, including:

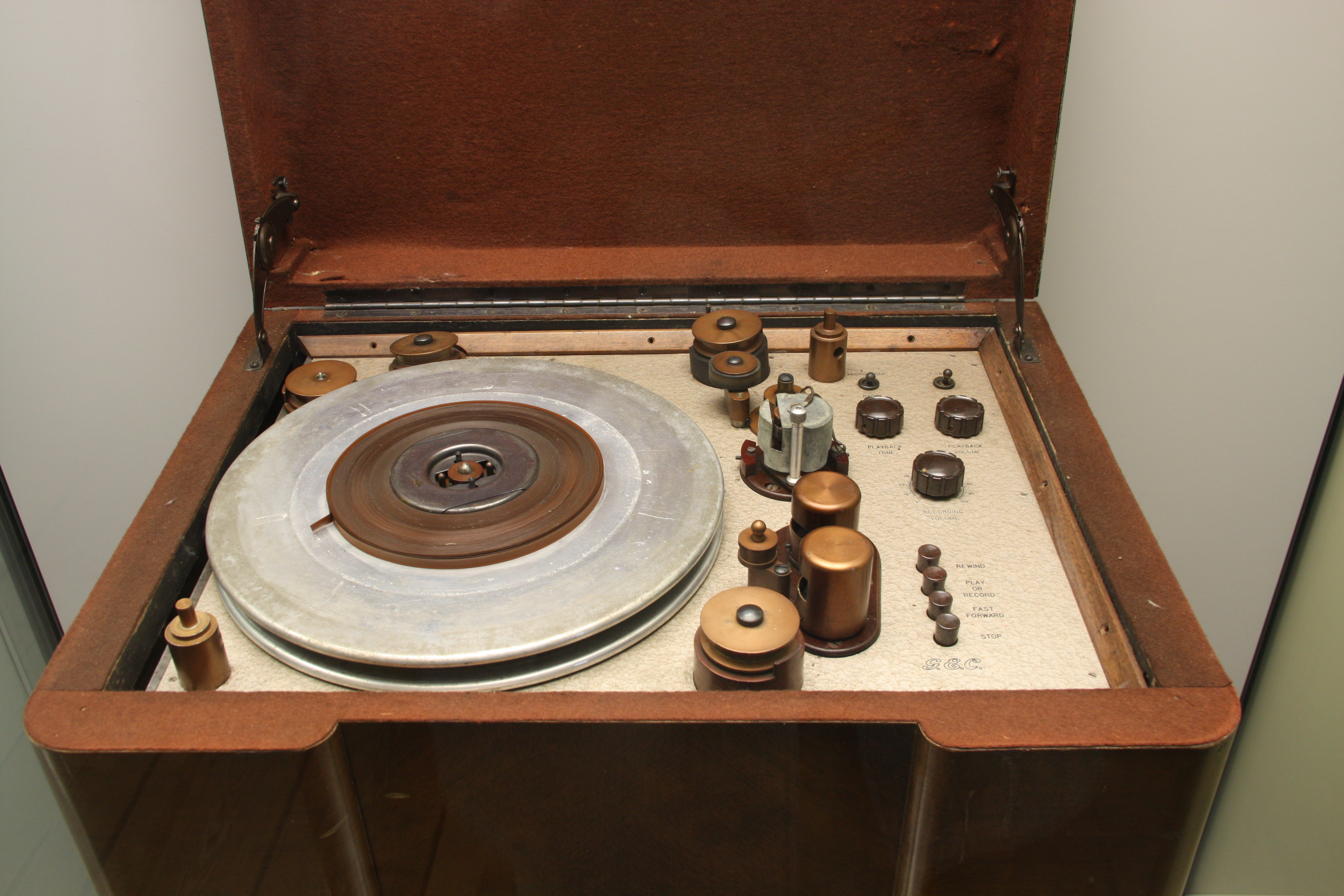
Prototype reel-to-reel tape machine produced by SEI, in the collection of the Museum of Science and Industry (Manchester)

- Electrical measuring and indicating instruments including process control meters and exposure meters
- Magnetic powders
- Coils and cores for toroidal inductors and transformers
- Radio cores
- Quartz crystal units and crystal valves
- Transistors, capacitors and rectifiers
- Thermostatic devices
- Mercury switches and relays
- Synthetic sapphires
- Optical components including photometers and photo cells

It also manufactured consumer products, including the UK version of the Viewmaster in the 1940s.
