= Radial (radio) =

Radio antenna feature

In RF engineering, radial has three distinct meanings, all referring to lines which radiate from (or intersect at) a radio antenna.

Ground system radial wires
When used in the context of antenna construction, radial wires are physical objects: conductors are laid outward from the base of a vertical antenna to form a low-loss ground-return system that minimizes power dissipation in the earth. The radial wires either may run above the surface of the earth (elevated radials), on the surface (on ground radials), or buried a centimeter or so under the earth (buried radials). The ends of the wires nearest the antenna base are connected to the antenna system electrical ground, and the far ends are either unconnected, or connected to metal stakes driven into the earth.

Top loading radial wires
Symmetrically arranged radial wires may also be attached to the top of an antenna, running horizontally away from its apex. For practical length radials, their effect is to improve feedpoint impedance of a short antenna almost the same as extending the height of the antenna by an amount equal to the combined length of all the radials, up to a point of diminishing returns around about a dozen radials. The radials do not themselves radiate, but may indirectly cause a small improvement in antenna radiation of short antennas by raising their point of maximum current upward along the main part of the mast.

Map radial lines
When used in the context of planning for a transmission system, radial lines are a concept used when describing a radio station's broadcast range: The radials in this case are several lines drawn on a map, radiating from the transmitter, with evenly spaced horizontal bearings. The radial extends as far as the transmitted signal can reach either by calculation or by measurement.

== Ground system radial wires ==
Stations transmitting at low frequencies like the mediumwave and longwave AM broadcast bands, and some lower shortwave frequencies, have frequencies so low that any feasible antenna is necessarily short compared to the wavelength, the most common being a quarter wave vertical antenna. These wires are called radials, ground radials, grounding radials, ground system radials or earthing radials.

The radials at the antenna base provide a proper ground plane for the types of radio antennas used for long wavelengths. These "half dipole" antennas require grounding or earthing wires in order to function well, since the virtual image of the antenna electrically reflected by the mirror-like ground system is an essential part of the operation of the actual antenna standing above the ground system. The radials are typically buried in the soil or laid on the soil in a flat, radial pattern.

=== Practical issues for ground system radials ===
The ground system radials do not have to be absolutely straight nor absolutely horizontal. Although they provide an electrical "ground", they do not require any actual contact with the surrounding earth, even though advisable.

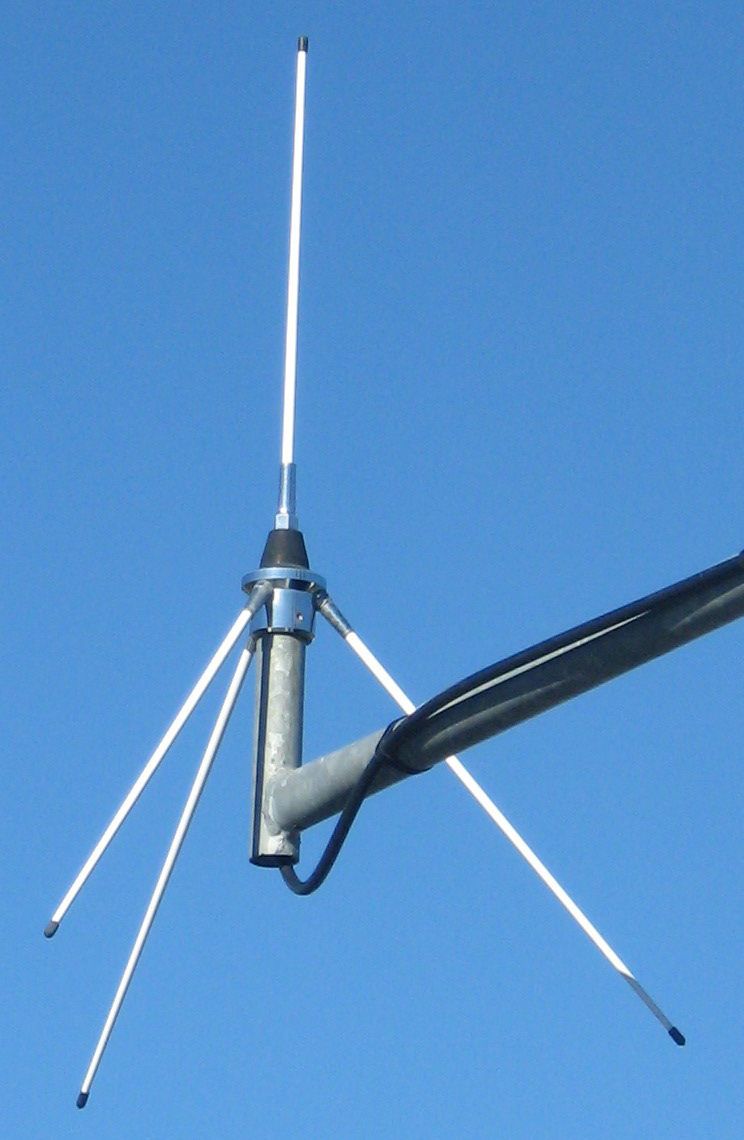
A ground plane antenna. The white, downward sloping arms are radials.

When the radials are mechanically incorporated into the structure of a small antenna it is called a ground plane antenna. For these antennas the radials slope off at an angle and are also called a skirt.

Radials lying upon the ground or within it are not resonant, and there is a great deal of practical latitude in the length and number of radials, although licensing requirements may demand excessive numbers and lengths. (Note: Longstanding US FCC regulations for AM broadcasting stations require 120 radials, each 1/4 wave long. Amateurs have found that between a third and a half that number are ample, and that the length of the radials may be 1/8 wave or shorter if there are enough of them.) Elevated radials are far more efficient at intercepting electrical fields before they reach the earth, so that only three or four may suffice, but since their electrical properties are not dampended by adjacent soil they must be cut to a resonant length.

=== Electrical hazards ===
When well designed, the far ends of the wires in the ground system carry extremely high voltages. If elevated above the soil, the ends are often connected to ground rods as a safety measure, rather than to improve the function of the antenna. Because of the same hazard, elevated radials are placed at least eight feet above the ground surface, to be out of reach of passers by, or over a fenced area.

Any metal object within the near field of the radiator must also be directly tied to the ground system, or the metal will become charged with radio-frequency voltage, and become an electric shock hazard. If large enough to act as a parasitic radiator it may also affect or distort the antenna radiation pattern. (Note: In one unusual case, the strip mall built around the WSB AM tower near Atlanta has every metal object (such as plumbing and ductwork) grounded for this reason.)

== Top loading radial wires ==
Similar radial wires can be placed on the top of antennas (instead of at the base) that also promote more efficient distribution of current in the antenna, but the structure of radial wires added to the top end of the antenna is called a capacitance hat or top loading. Like ground radials, top radials are symmetrically arranged wires placed to radiate away from the apex of the antenna, ideally running horizontally away from the top. Electrically, this is equivalent to attaching a capacitor at the top of the antenna, whose other contact is wired to the ground system, which constitutes the opposite plate of the capacitor.

Top loading antennas is a way to effectively increase the height of an antenna (for some purposes, but not all) either to reduce the reactance at the feedpoint, or to indirectly increase radiation resistance by increasing the amount of current in the vertical part of the mast. Although coils can be used to similarly load an antenna, using coils introduces resistance losses from the substantial amount of wire needed; using radials for capacitive loading effectively adds no loss.

=== Practical considerations for loading radials ===
For radials 9 electrical degrees or less (1/40 wavelength, each, or shorter) the effect on feedpoint impedance and the current in the mast is the same as extending the height of the antenna by a length of wire equal to 99% of the total length of all the radials, up to about a dozen radials. (Note: When the radials are packed together too densely, they begin to interfere with each other's electrical field lines, and reduce each other's effect. Various other shapes such as a solid ring with a few conducting spokes may be better than several radials.) The radials may cause a small to moderate improvement in antenna radiation by raising the point of maximum current upward along the main part of the antenna, although symmetrical radials themselves do not radiate.

Horizontal radial wires are ideal, but sometimes difficult to support. As a substitute same-lengths of conductive top segments of down-sloping guy wires can be electrically connected to the antenna apex. This is less than ideal, but often more feasible for long top radials on towers. When guy wires are used for top loading instead of horizontal radial wires, they must not extend very far down the mast, since the guy wires will block some radiation from the mast, which causes a conflict between loss caused by the radiating mast being "shadowed" by the guy wires, and the indirect gains realized by the increased current in the radiating part of the mast.

== Map radial lines ==
The use of radial lines on a map for measurement, planning, and regulation of radio transmissions is called the radial method. It has no relation to grounding radials described above.

=== Radials for transmission planning ===
In the field of transmission planning, radials are evenly spaced points (vectors) along evenly spaced lines (bearings) from a common point on a map, which are used to determine the average elevation above mean sea level (AMSL) within a radio station's broadcast range (including broadcast stations and cellphone base stations, among others).

This in turn determines the station's height above average terrain (HAAT), which greatly affects its coverage area (more so than effective radiated power), and therefore the potential for RF interference with other adjacent stations or cells. This information must be submitted with an application for a construction permit. The points used for calculation may differ if a directional antenna is used.

=== Background of the radial method ===
The use of the radial method is more common in North America, where the FCC and CRTC use it in mediumwave transmission planning and regulation. In Europe and Asia, the use of radials has fallen out of favor since the 1970s, and in many nations the radial antenna proof is only acceptable as an ancillary antenna proof. Canada and Mexico, due to lower population densities, never implemented the fully complete radial models that the US FCC did.

The radial method has been falling out of favor for methods based on Cartesian coordinates. Cartesian methods require more CPU time (and memory) to compute, but are understood to more realistically represent antenna systems. The main importance of the radial methods is that a quick antenna system proof can be completed in less than 15 minutes (often in only 5 minutes) of a typical home computer's CPU time, regardless of antenna system complexity.

=== Regulatory use of radials ===
The ITU over the past 50 years — in consideration of the various population densities of its members — officially mandates a minimum of 5 radials for an entire antenna system.

Although many broadcasting regulators around the world had to find some way of regulating longwave and mediumwave antenna patterns and power, only the FCC chose to implement the radial method in its fullest form.

The FCC decision to fully implement radials evolved from 1925 to 1975. Technology had changed, and by the 1980s, computer terrain simulation of station interference and station patterns could be done on mainframes, typically using Cartesian or other non-radial methods.

The FCC rules on radials were relaxed in stages from 1996 to 2013. It is expected that the 2013 ruleset for radials will probably endure without change for a decade.

== See also ==
- Broadcast range
- Ground plane antenna
- Ground plane
- Radio antenna
