= Oslo Report =

1939 military intelligence leak

The Oslo Report was one of the most spectacular leaks in the history of military intelligence. Written by German mathematician and physicist Hans Ferdinand Mayer on 1 and 2 November 1939 during a business trip to Oslo, Norway, it described several German weapons, some in service and others being developed.

Mayer mailed the Report anonymously in the form of two letters to the British Embassy in Oslo, where they were passed on to MI6 in London for further analysis, providing an invaluable resource to the British in developing counter-measures, especially to navigational and targeting radars and contributed to the British winning the Battle of Britain.

== Background ==
Hans Ferdinand Mayer received his doctorate in physics from the University of Heidelberg in 1920. After spending two years as a research associate there in his doctoral supervisor's (Philipp Lenard) laboratory, he joined Siemens AG in 1922. He became interested in telecommunications and joined Siemens' communication research laboratory, becoming its director in 1936. In this position, he had contacts all over Europe and the United States and had access to a wide range of information about electronics development in Germany, especially in the military sector.

== Sending the report ==
After Hitler invaded Poland on 1 September 1939, Mayer decided to divulge to the British as much as he could about military secrets to defeat the Nazi regime. He arranged a business trip to Scandinavia in late October 1939, arrived at his first scheduled stop, Oslo, Norway, on 30 October 1939 and checked into the Hotel Bristol. Mayer borrowed a typewriter from the hotel, and typed the seven-page Oslo Report in the form of two letters over two days. He mailed the first on 1 November, asking the British military attaché to arrange for the BBC World Service to alter the introduction to its German-language programme if he wished to receive the Report. This was done, and he sent the Report along with a vacuum tube from a prototype proximity fuze.

He also wrote a letter to his long-time British friend Henry Turner, asking him to communicate with him via their Danish colleague Niels Holmblad. This indirect communication path was required since Britain and Germany were at war, but Denmark was neutral. Mayer continued his travels to Denmark to visit Holmblad, asking if he could relay information between himself and Turner. Holmblad readily agreed, but once Hitler invaded Denmark on 9 April 1940, this communication route was no longer feasible. Mayer then returned to Germany, and was arrested for political offenses by the Gestapo in 1943. He was imprisoned at Dachau and other Nazi concentration camps until the war ended. The Nazis never knew of the Oslo Report.

== British reaction ==
On 4 November 1939, Captain Hector Boyes, the Naval Attaché at the British Embassy in Oslo, received an anonymous letter offering him a secret report on the latest German technical developments. To receive the report, he was to arrange for the usual announcement of the BBC World Service's German-language broadcast to be changed to "Hullo, hier ist London". This was done and resulted in the delivery of a parcel a week later, which contained a typewritten document and a type of vacuum tube, a sensor for a proximity fuze for shells or bombs. The document became famous after its existence was revealed in 1947 and would go down in history as the "Oslo Report". Boyes quickly appreciated the Report's potential importance and had a member of the embassy staff make a translation which he forwarded to MI6 in London along with the original.

The Oslo Report was received with indifference or even disbelief by British Intelligence, with the notable exception of Dr. R. V. Jones, a young Ph.D. physicist who had recently been put in charge of a new field called "Scientific Intelligence". Jones argued that despite the breadth of information and a few inaccuracies, the technical details were correct and argued that all the electronic systems divulged therein be further explored. In a 1940 report, Jones summarized his thoughts,

The contribution of this source to the present problem may be summarised in the statements that the Germans were bringing into use an R.D.F. [Radio Direction Finding, the British name for radar] system similar to our own,... A careful review of the whole report leaves only two possible conclusions: (1) that it was a "plant" to persuade us that the Germans were as well advanced as ourselves or (2) that the source was genuinely disaffected from Germany, and wished to tell us all he knew. The general accuracy of the information, the gratuitous presentation of the fuse, and the fact that the source made no effort, as far as it is known, to exploit the matter, together with the subsequent course of the war and our recent awakening with Knickebein, weigh heavily in favour of the second conclusion. It seems, then, that the source was reliable, and he was manifestly competent.

In his 1989 book, Jones summarized the importance of the Oslo Report,

It was probably the best single report received from any source during the war.... Overall, of course, the contributions from other sources such as the Enigma decrypts, aerial photographs, and reports from the Resistance, outweighed the Oslo contribution, but these were all made from organizations involving many, sometimes thousands of individuals and operating throughout most of the war. The Oslo Report, we believed, had been written by a single individual who in one great flash had given us a synoptic glimpse of much of what was foreshadowed in German military electronics.

While Jones trusted the Oslo Report, the Admiralty thought that the Report was "too good to be true" and was deception by the Abwehr, with its fantastic claims written by psychological warfare experts. An additional argument raised by the doubters was that no person could have such wide knowledge of weapons technology as discussed in the Report. This was mainly because of service rivalry in Britain and the US and it was known that there was similar rivalry in Germany. The Oslo Report is concentrated on electronic technology; several big German companies were involved in such projects for all three armed forces and some scientists in these companies would have had knowledge of much of the research being conducted.

== Report contents ==
The original typed report was seven pages long. It was retyped, with a number of carbon copies being made for distribution. No specimen of the original translation is known and the German version held by the Imperial War Museum is one of the carbon copies and lacks the sketches that were apparently included in Mayer's original. A typed copy in German can also be found in the Public Record Office, while the report has been published twice in English translation. The section headings given here correspond to those in the report. Some of the information Mayer heard was second-hand and later proved to be incorrect.

=== Ju 88 programme ===
Junkers Ju 88 medium bomber production levels are stated to be probably 5,000 per month, with a total of over 25,000–30,000 predicted to be produced by April 1940. This turned out to be a huge exaggeration of production levels, as total production of the Ju88 during the entire war was 15,000.

=== Franken ===
The report states that the German navy's first aircraft carrier is at Kiel, and was expected to be finished in April 1940. The carrier was referred to as Franken. It is sometimes suggested that Mayer was mistaken and that he was instead identifying the carrier Graf Zeppelin. The construction of Graf Zeppelin was well known to Allied navies. Following Kriegsmarine ship naming policy, she was known as "Flugzeugträger A" prior to her launch and naming on 8 December 1938.

A second carrier known as "Flugzeugträger B" was also laid down in Kiel in 1938 with a launch date planned for July 1940, possibly to be named as Peter Strasser. Work on this second carrier was halted in September 1939 and she was broken up the following year. It is possible that Mayer misinterpreted the construction of the large naval tanker Franken for this second aircraft carrier and wanted to alert the Allies to this development. The naval tanker (launched on 8 March 1939) was being built next to the Graf Zeppelin, itself still under construction.

=== Remote-controlled gliders ===
This section of the report described remote-controlled gliders with a 3 m (9.8 ft) wingspan and 3 m (9.8 ft) long, carrying an explosive charge, fitted with an altimeter intended to maintain them at an altitude of 3 m (9.8 ft) above the water, the horizontal stage of their flight to be powered by a rocket motor. This description is similar to the Blohm & Voss BV 143, or if the wingspan alone is considered, it could have referred to the Henschel Hs 293 design, controlled with an FuG 203 Kehl transmitter in the aircraft and an FuG 230 Straßburg receiver in the ordnance.

=== Autopilot ===
Here, Mayer briefly described another remote-controlled system, this time for an aircraft instead of for a rocket.

=== Remote-controlled projectiles ===
The German word Geschoss was used in the report, which can be translated to mean artillery shell, but the German text clearly states that a rocket was meant. This is also clear from the remark that the projectile is highly unstable when fired, while artillery shells would be spin-stabilized (or fin-stabilized in the case of mortar projectiles). The mentioned size of 80 cm (31.5 in)-calibre was seen as a curious item at the time; even by 1943, British rocket developers were focused on solid fuels and thinking in diameters of around 76 mm (3 in). A solid fuel rocket of more than ten times this diameter would have caused a credibility gap, which did in fact happen when more information later became available to British intelligence. With hindsight, the description can be recognised as the A8 rocket, which had a diameter of 78 cm (30.7 in). The crucial item of information omitted by the author of the Oslo Report was the use of liquid fuels in the German ballistic rocket program.

=== Rechlin ===
Rechlin is a small town on the southern shore of Lake Müritz north of Berlin, with the turf-covered airfield – some 4.5 km (2.8 mi) north of the 21st century Rechlin–Lärz Airfield – being the core of the Luftwaffe's central Erprobungstelle aviation test facility, first built as a military airfield by the German Empire in August 1918. The facility's main grass airfield, set up in the manner of a pre-WW II aerodrome without clearly defined runways, was bounded by a roughly hexagonal-layout perimeter road that is extant. Mayer noted that the Luftwaffe's laboratories and research centers were there and that it was a "worthwhile point of attack" for bombers.

=== Methods of attacks on bunkers ===
Mayer noted during the invasion of Poland in 1939, Polish bunkers were attacked using smoke shells which forced their crews to withdraw deeper into the bunkers, following which soldiers armed with flamethrowers attacked under cover of the smoke.

=== Air raid warning equipment ===
Mayer mentions that the British air raid on Wilhelmshaven in September 1939 was detected while the aircraft were 120 km (75 mi) from the German coast using radar. He also gives the technical characteristics of the German early-warning radar systems: power, pulse duration, and range were described in some detail, along with counter-measures that could exploit the radar system's vulnerabilities. Mayer did not know the most important piece of information, the wavelength. He mentioned April 1940 as the deadline for installation of this radar, and described a similar system that was under development, that operated on a 50 cm (20 in) wavelength. The FuG 200 Hohentwiel ASV airborne maritime search radar and the FuG 202 Lichtenstein AI night fighter radar operated in the low-UHF band, 490 to 550 MHz frequencies of around 50 cm (20 in) wavelength.

This section of the report revealed Mayer's depth of knowledge of radar technology. The operational radar principle he revealed – a short burst of transmitted energy, measuring the time-of-flight and calculating range from it – was known by the British and was already used in the Chain Home early warning radar. Revealing the details of the system under development allowed the British to invent a simple countermeasure they called Window, already known to the Germans as Düppel, which consisted of strips of aluminium foil of a length designed to optimally reflect the German 50 cm (20 in) radar signals, jamming them. It was learned that 50 cm (20 in) was a standard wavelength of German defensive radars, which made Window an effective method of blinding all their defensive radar systems. It was first used in Operation Gomorrah, the raids on Hamburg beginning on 24/25 July 1943.

=== Aircraft rangefinder ===
Mayer described a system being developed at Rechlin for navigating German bombers to their targets, which used a radio transmission accurately to locate a bomber's range from the transmitter. This was the Y-Gerät (Y-apparatus). Mayer gave the wavelength as 6 m (20 ft) (50 MHz). Mayer's description was fairly accurate, though it actually operated at 45 MHz.

=== Torpedoes ===
Mayer described two new types of torpedoes in service with the German navy. The first was a type of acoustic torpedo designed to be used from distances of 10 km (6.2 mi). It was intended to be steered close to a convoy using a long wave radio receiver, then two acoustic receivers in the head of the torpedo would take over when it came within a few hundred metres of a ship. The second type of torpedo (mentioned as the same type that was used to sink HMS Royal Oak in 1939), was described as having a magnetic pistol designed to detect the deviations in the Earth's magnetic field caused by a ship's metal hull and explode beneath its keel. Mayer described the principle of the fuze and suggested that it could be defended against by generating a suitable magnetic field. The second type was deployed by the Germans as a mine. The Allies defeated it by degaussing their ships so that the mine could no longer detect them. The Allies were also able to sweep the mines by generating a suitable magnetic field to trip the mine.

=== Electric fuzes for bombs and shells ===
The final section of the report described how mechanical fuzes for artillery shells were being discontinued in favour of electrical fuzes and mentioned that bombs already had electrical fuzes. Mayer described the working of bomb fuzes and described electrical time fuzes. He also mentioned an idea for a proximity fuze, i.e. one that detonates a warhead as it nears a target. The fuze he described sensed its target by changes in partial capacitances, which in practice turned out to be impracticable. He mentioned its anti-aircraft applications and its use in anti-personnel artillery shells, an application which was later employed by the Allies. Mayer concluded by mentioning that the fuzes were manufactured by Rheinmetall in Sömmerda, Thüringen.

== Revealing the report and the author ==
On 12 February 1947, Jones gave a talk to the Royal United Services Institute that publicly revealed for the first time the existence and importance of the Oslo Report.

It [the Oslo Report] told us that the Germans had two kinds of radar equipment, that large rockets were being developed, that there was an important experimental establishment at Peenemünde and that rocket-driven glider bombs were being tried there. There was also other information—so much of it in fact that many people argued that it must be a plant by the Germans, because no one man could possibly have known all of the developments that the report described. But as the War progressed and one development after another actually appeared, it was obvious that the report was largely correct; and in the few dull moments of the War I used to look up the Oslo report to see what should be coming along next.

This part of his talk caught the eye of the press and it was widely publicized. Jones revealed some of the Report's contents, holding back many details to test anyone claiming authorship but neither Henry Cobden Turner nor Mayer heard of the talk at the time.

By chance Turner and Jones were on the same voyage of the RMS Queen Mary in 1953 and one evening, they sat at the same dinner table. They found much in common and Jones invited Turner to a dinner at his London club. On 15 December 1953 the dinner was arranged, during which one of Jones' friends, Professor Frederick Norman of King's College London, excitedly shouted "Oslo!!". Turner and Norman privately told Jones over after-dinner drinks that Turner had heard from his old German friend, Hans Ferdinand Mayer at the beginning of the war, in a letter written from Oslo.

Upon learning of Mayer's background and position at Siemens, Jones decided to open a correspondence with Mayer using Turner as a middleman. Jones and Mayer met at a 1955 radar conference in Munich and had dinner with Turner at Mayer's house. Jones quickly determined that Mayer had written the Oslo Report. They agreed that divulging who had written the Report would serve no purpose and agreed to silence. They continued to exchange letters, with Mayer providing more details about how he wrote it.

Jones decided to write a book about his wartime scientific intelligence work for MI6 but it did not appear until 1978, when it was published as Most Secret War in the UK and The Wizard War in the United States. In the book, he discussed how he used the Oslo Report but did not reveal the author.

Inevitably, the question will be asked regarding my own ideas about the identity of the Oslo author.

I believe that I know, but the way in which the identity was revealed to me was so extraordinary that it may well not be credited.

In any event, it belongs to a later period, and the denouement must wait until then.

Mayer died in 1980 without being publicly acknowledged as the author. Jones' sequel, published in 1989, revealed the author's identity.
