= Diamond–Dunmore system =

Blind landing system

The Diamond–Dunmore system was an early blind landing system developed by Harry Diamond and Francis Dunmore at the National Bureau of Standards in the late 1920s. It was similar to the beam landing systems being developed in the UK and Germany shortly thereafter, but had the added advantage that the directional signal was automatically decoded and displayed on a cockpit indicator, rather than requiring the attention of a radio operator. It also added an optional vertical guidance system to provide a glideslope indication. In spite of the advanced nature of the system, or perhaps because of it, the system does not appear to have been widely used. In contrast, the simpler Lorenz system was widely deployed in Europe.

== Description ==
The lateral guidance system used two signals on a single carrier frequency around 330 kHz that was amplitude modulated at slightly different frequencies, 65 and 86.7 Hz. The two signals were broadcast from a crossed coil antenna placed at the far end of the active runway, with each coil receiving one of the two signals. The resulting broadcast pattern formed two large eclipses, slightly overlapping along the centerline of the runway. As the aircraft approached the airport, the aircraft's conventional voice radio would be tuned to the carrier frequency and begin to receive the mixed signal. The system was designed so that the signals would become usable at about 15 miles (24 km) range.

The output of the aircraft radio was sent into a low-pass filter that split out the navigation signal on the way to the user's headphones, so it was not audible. The low-frequency portion of the signal was then sent to into a panel instrument containing two vibrating-reed frequency meters, one tuned to 65 and the other to 86.7 Hz. If the aircraft was properly aligned off the end of the runway, it would receive equal amounts of each signal, and the two reed meters would indicate equal strength. If the aircraft were to one side of the runway, the signal on that side would be stronger, and the reed meter would show a larger displacement. Visually they were indicated as two vertical white rectangles side by side on a black background. Stronger signals caused the white area to grow vertically, so the pilot could easily tell if they were properly aligned by comparing the size of the two white areas. If they were not aligned, turning towards the longer bar would put them back on course.

A second highly-directional transmitter was placed 5 miles (8.0 km) from the end of the active runway, the "boundary marker". This was a highly directional short-range signal on the same 330 kHz frequency but modulated at a higher frequency and aimed perpendicular to the runway midline. As the aircraft approached the runway, a brief signal would be received from this transmitter which would bypass the low-pass filter to cause a tone to play in the pilot's headphones, while also overriding the guidance signal and causing the reed indicators to jump. This indicated the aircraft should begin its approach.

The system also included an optional signal operating on 93.7 MHz that provided vertical guidance, a feature that competing systems like the Lorenz beam generally lacked. This was a single signal broadcast in a tightly focused beam placed at the far end of the runway that was tilted upward at an 8 degree angle and powered so it would become usable at about 8 miles (13 km). This tight broadcast pattern was only possible due to the, for the era, extremely high carrier frequency. This required a separate specialized receiver radio in the aircraft to be used, in contrast to the main signal which could be used with any contemporary radio.

The vertical indicator was simpler than the lateral, consisting simply of a ammeter connected to the output of the radio. The pilot would approach the runway at 1000 feet altitude over the ground using the lateral signal and then listen for the boundary marker signal to indicate they were within range of the vertical signal. Then would then adjust the ammeter so its needle was centered in the display. From then on, the approach of the aircraft towards the transmitter would result in the signal growing in strength according to the inverse square law. This would naturally cause the needle to rise in the dial and cause the pilot to correct this by lowering their altitude. The result is a parabolic approach to the runway.
