= Reginald Victor Jones =

British scientist and military consultant (1911–1997)

R. V. Jones
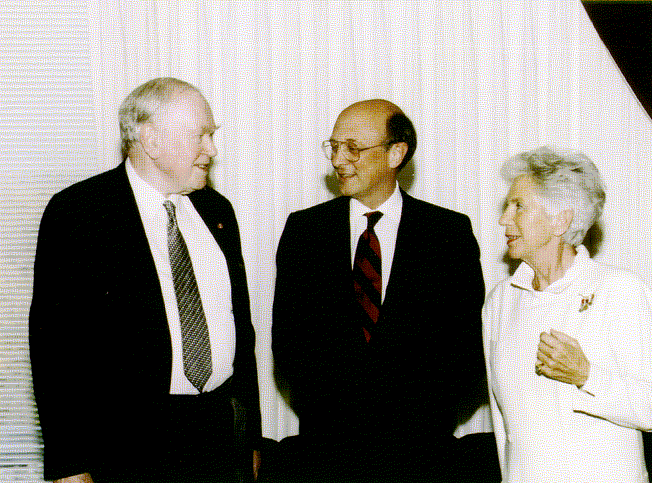
- R. V. Jones (left) with R. James Woolsey Jr. (Director of Central Intelligence) and Jeannie Rousseau (French WWII spy), 1993
- Born: 29 September 1911; Herne Hill, London
- Died: 17 December 1997 (aged 86)
- Education: Wadham College, University of Oxford
- Known for: Physicist and scientific military intelligence expert
- Awards: Commander of the Order of the British Empire (1942); Companion of the Order of the Bath (1946); Duddell Medal and Prize (1960); Fellow of the Royal Society (1965); R. V. Jones Intelligence Award (1993); Member of the Order of the Companions of Honour (1994); Doctor of Science (honoris causa, 1996)
- Scientific career
- Workplaces: Royal Aircraft Establishment; Air Ministry (Intelligence); University of Aberdeen

Reginald Victor Jones (29 September 1911 – 17 December 1997) was a British physicist and scientific military intelligence expert who played an important role in the defence of Britain in World War II by solving scientific and technical problems, and by the extensive use of deception throughout the war to confuse the Germans.

== Early life ==
Reginald Jones was born in Herne Hill, South London, on 29 September 1911. He was educated at Alleyn's School, Dulwich, and Wadham College, Oxford, where he studied Natural Sciences. In 1932 he graduated with First Class honours in physics and then, working in the Clarendon Laboratory, completed his DPhil in 1934. Subsequently, he took up a Skynner Senior Studentship in Astronomy at Balliol College, Oxford.

== Assistant Director of Intelligence (Science) ==
In 1936, Jones took up a post at the Royal Aircraft Establishment, Farnborough, a part of the Air Ministry. Here he worked on the problems associated with defending Britain from an air attack, and later in support of the liberation of Europe from the Nazis. More generally, he was fond of practical jokes and describes in his book Most Secret War how he used that skill to deceive the Germans during World War II. His extensive use of deception to deceive the Germans is consistent with the term disinformation, which is defined as deliberate planting of false information and physical evidence to lead an opponent astray.

In September 1939, the British decided to assign a scientist to the Intelligence section of the Air Ministry. No scientist had previously worked for an intelligence service. Jones quickly rose to become Assistant Director of Intelligence (Science) there. During the course of the Second World War he was closely involved with the scientific assessment of enemy technology, and the development of offensive and counter-measures technology. He solved a number of tough scientific and technical intelligence problems during World War II and is generally known today as the "father of S&T Intelligence".

He was briefly based at Bletchley Park in September 1939, but returned to London (Broadway) in November, leaving behind a small specialized team in Hut 3, who reported any decrypts of scientific or technological nature to "ADI Science".

F. W. Winterbotham passed Jones the Oslo Report, received in 1939 from an anti-Nazi German scientist, and Jones decided that it was genuine and largely reliable, though the three service ministries regarded it as a "plant" and discarded their copies: "... in the few dull moments of the War, I used to look up the Oslo report to see what should be coming along next."

=== Radio beam guidance ===
Jones's first job was to study "new German weapons", real or potential. The first of these was a radio navigation system which the Germans called Knickebein. This, as Jones soon determined, was a development of the Lorenz blind landing system and enabled an aircraft to fly along a chosen heading with useful accuracy.

At Jones's urging, Winston Churchill ordered up an RAF search aircraft on the night of 21 June 1940, and the aircraft found the Knickebein radio signals in the frequency range which Jones had predicted. With this knowledge, the British were able to build jammers whose effect was to "bend" the Knickebein beams so that German bombers spent months scattering their bomb loads over the British countryside.

Thus began the "Battle of the Beams" which lasted throughout much of World War II, with the Germans developing new radio navigation systems and the British developing countermeasures to them. Jones frequently had to battle against entrenched interests in the armed forces, but, in addition to enjoying Churchill's confidence, had strong support from, among others, Churchill's scientific advisor F. A. Lindemann and the Chief of the Air Staff Sir Charles Portal.

=== Fooling radar with metal foil (chaff) ===
As early as 1937, Jones had suggested that a piece of metal foil falling through the air might create radar echoes. He, together with Joan Curran, was later instrumental in the deployment of "Window": strips of metal foil, cut to a length appropriate to the radar's wavelength, and dropped in bundles from aircraft, which then appeared on enemy radar screens as "false bombers". This technology is now known as chaff and contrary to the popular belief, was also known to the Germans at the time. Both parties were reluctant to use it out of fear that their enemy would do the same. This delayed its allied deployment for almost two years.

Jones also served as a V-2 rocket expert on the Cabinet Defence Committee (Operations) and headed a German long range weapons targeting deception under the Double-Cross System.

== Postwar and awards ==
In 1946, Jones was appointed to the Chair of Natural Philosophy at the University of Aberdeen, which he held until his retirement in 1981. He did not want to stay in Intelligence under the proposed postwar reorganisation. During his time at Aberdeen, much of his attention was devoted to improving the sensitivity of scientific instruments such as seismometers, capacitance micrometers, microbarographs and optical levers. His book Instruments and Experiences details much of his later work in some depth and can act as a reference work on fine mechanism design.

Jones was appointed Commander of the Order of the British Empire (CBE) in 1942, for the planning of a raid on Bruneval to capture German radar equipment (Churchill had proposed that Jones should be appointed a Companion of the Order of the Bath (CB) but the head of the Civil Service Sir Horace Wilson threatened to resign as Jones was only a lowly Scientific Officer, and the CBE was a compromise.) He was subsequently appointed CB in 1946; and Companion of Honour (CH) in the 1994 Queen's Birthday Honours. He was elected Fellow of the Royal Society in 1965, and received an honorary DSc from the University of Aberdeen in 1996. In 1969 he delivered the Wilkins Lecture.

Jones was principal interviewee of the BBC One TV documentary series "The Secret War", first aired on 5 January 1977 and narrated by William Woollard.

His 1978 published autobiography Most Secret War: British Scientific Intelligence 1939–1945 was described by historian A. J. P. Taylor as "the most fascinating book on the Second World War that I have ever read" and, more generally, it has acquired almost classic status.

In 1981, Jones became a founding member of the World Cultural Council. The same year he delivered the Royal Institution Christmas Lectures on From Magna Carta to Microchip.

In 1993, he was the first recipient of the R. V. Jones Intelligence Award, which the CIA created in his honour.

== Quotes ==
Jones published a book in 1989 entitled Reflections on Intelligence. In this book, he mused: "I for one would have little objection to any authority having any information it wished about my actions - or even my thoughts - provided that I could be sure that it would not misinterpret the information to come to false conclusions about me."

== Personal life ==
Jones married Vera Cain in 1940; they had two daughters and a son.

He died on 17 December 1997. He is buried in Corgarff Cemetery, Strathdon, Aberdeenshire. His papers are held by Churchill College, Cambridge.

== Publications ==
- Most Secret War: British Scientific Intelligence 1939–1945. Hamish Hamilton, London, 1978. ISBN 0-241-89746-7 (Available to borrow on Archive.org, free registration required) (Published in the US as The Wizard War with the same subtitle.)
- Instruments and Experiences. John Wiley and Sons, London, 1988. ISBN 047191763X
- Reflections on Intelligence. Heinemann, London, 1989. ISBN 0434377244

== See also ==
- Henry Tizard
- Frederick Lindemann, 1st Viscount Cherwell
