= Hotel Bristol =

International hotel

Hotel Bristol labels

The Hotel Bristol is the name of more than 200 hotels around the world. They range from grand European hotels, such as Hôtel Le Bristol Paris and the Hotel Bristol in Warsaw or Vienna to budget hotels, such as the SRO (single room occupancy) Bristol in San Francisco. They are not a chain, except in Brazil, where Bristol Hoteis & Resorts has around a dozen hotels throughout the country with the Bristol name.

== Origins ==
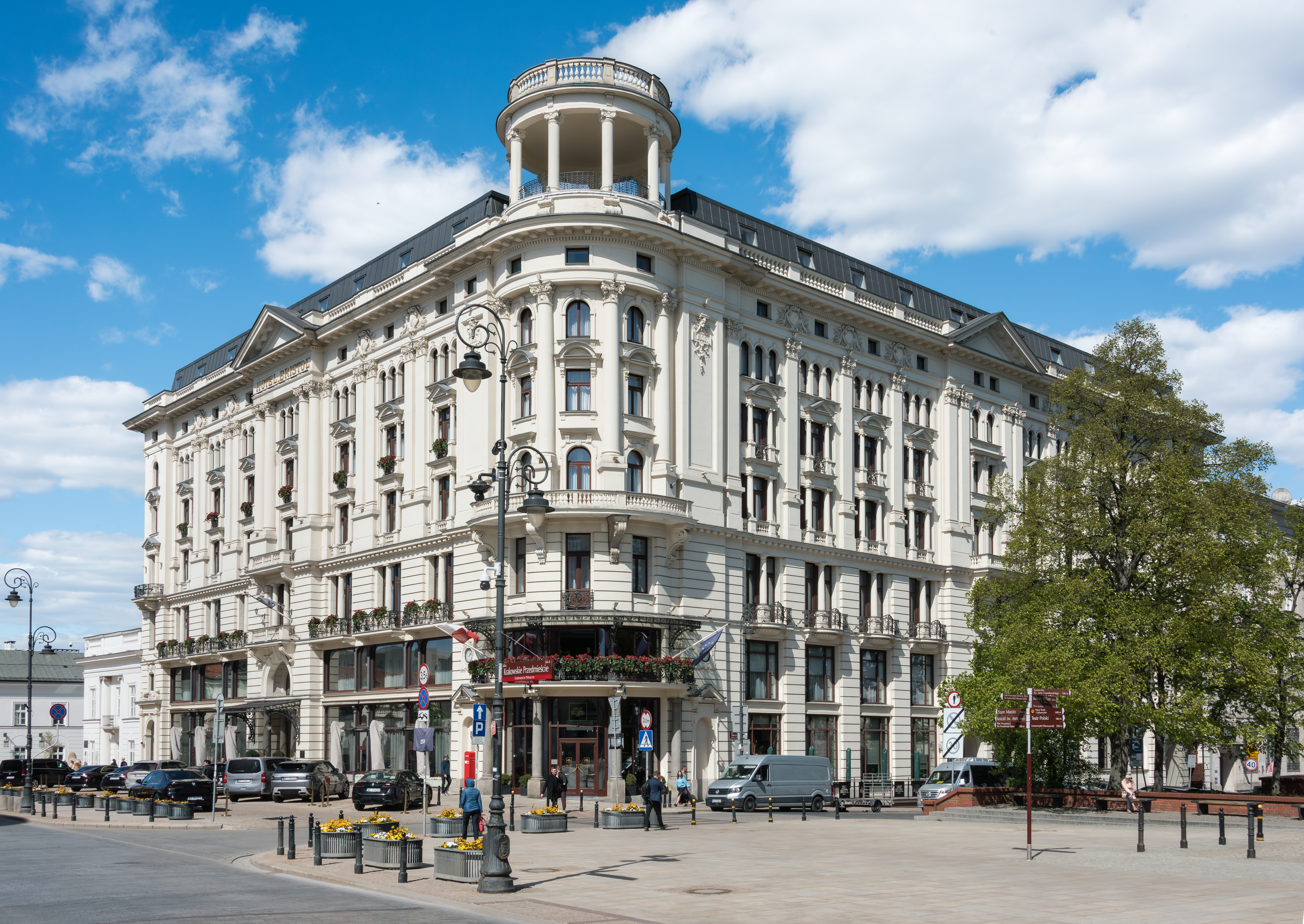
The Hotel Bristol in Warsaw

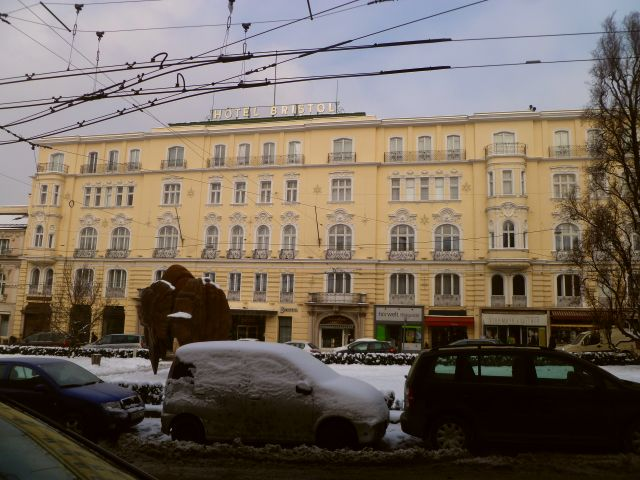
The Hotel Bristol in Salzburg

The first known Hotel Bristol was in Place Vendôme in Paris. It opened in 1816 and became a favourite of the Prince of Wales, later Edward VII, who had a suite there. When it closed in 1916, its name was fought over, and finally won by Hippolyte Jammet, who opened Hôtel Le Bristol Paris in nearby Rue du Faubourg Saint-Honoré, today one of the city's five-star palace hotels.

Two possible origins of the name are the association with the English port-city of Bristol, and Frederick Hervey, the fourth Earl of Bristol and Bishop of Derry (1730–1803). According to his biographer: "So widely famed was the Bishop as a traveller, and so great his reputation as a connoisseur of all good things, that Lord Bristol's hotel...came to be the best known and regarded in every city or town where he sojourned and was thus the precursor of the Hotels Bristol to be found all over Europe." Lord Bristol died in Italy at the start of the Napoleonic Wars (1803–15), which interrupted the Grand Tour. The Bristol in Paris was one of many opened in the ensuing peace, hoping to re-establish the Continental tourist trade.

The fact that many hotels, such as the Bernini Bristol in Rome, use the coat of arms of the City of Bristol in their logos leads to speculation that they are named after the city and not the Earl-Bishop. But there is no evidence that the Bristol family ever granted use of their arms to any hotel, while the city's coat of arms can freely be adopted to give an aristocratic image.

== Modern distribution ==
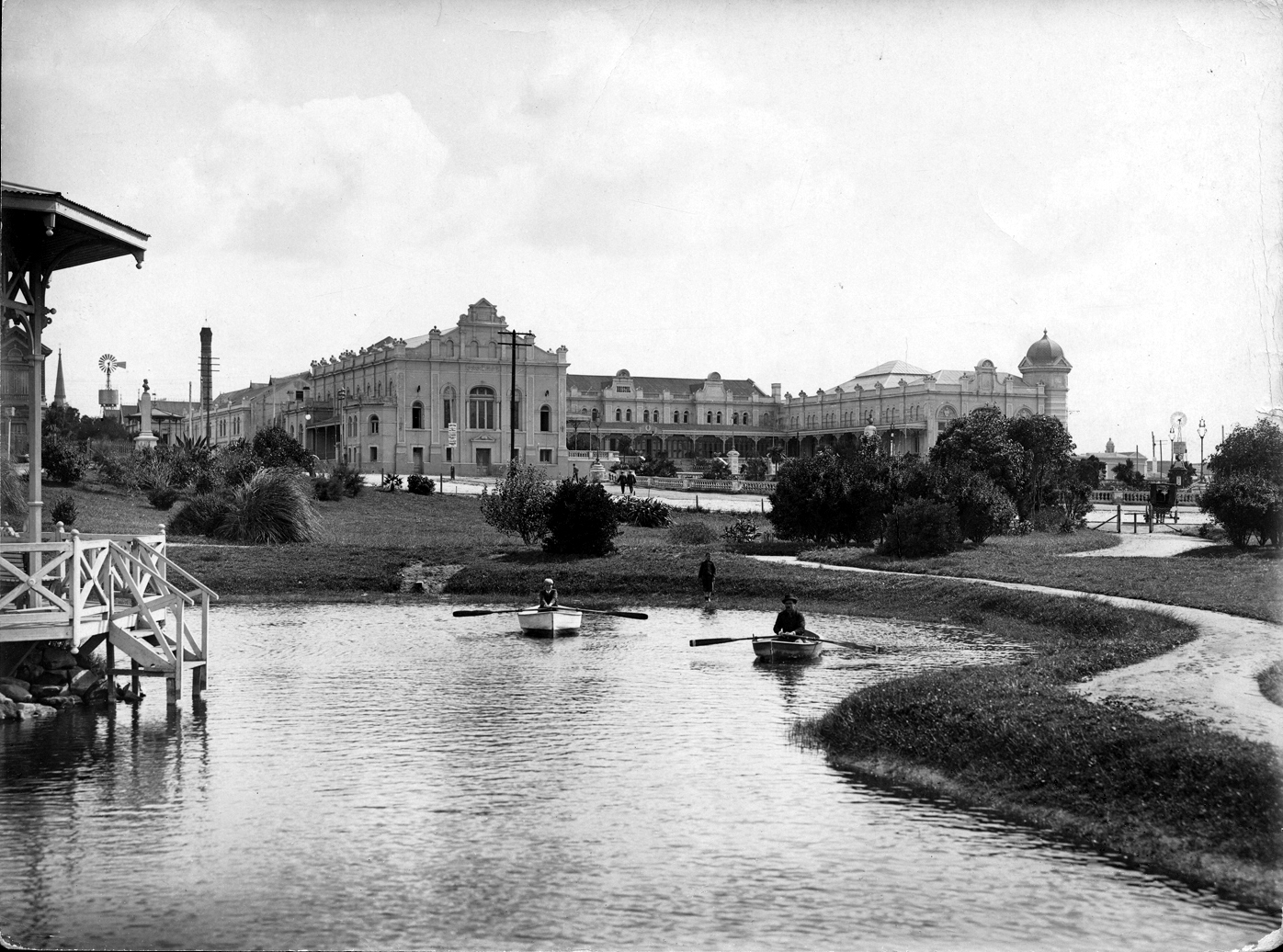
The Bristol Hotel, Mar del Plata, 1907.

Italy now has the most hotels of this name, with more than 50, whilst France has around 30. Many luxury Bristol hotels from the Edwardian era (for example in Beaulieu-sur-Mer, London, Lugano, Mar del Plata, New York City, Naples and St Petersburg) have not survived, but a new Hotel Bristol opened in St Petersburg in 2012, and the Bristol Hotel, Odessa (1899) has reclaimed its name after changing it to the Krasnaya Hotel during the Soviet era. One of the oldest still functioning is the Bernini Bristol in Rome, which opened in 1874. Bristol hotels also have a presence in the Middle East in Beirut since 1951 with Le Bristol Hotel Beirut. Modern hotels to use the name include those in Frankfurt, San Diego and Gurgaon, India. The city of Bristol in England did not have a Bristol hotel until 2007 when Jurys Hotel Bristol changed its name simply to The Bristol. Le Bristol Paris, which opened in 1925, continues to operate on Rue du Faubourg-Saint-Honoré.

== Associations ==
- Valerie Solanas, author of the S.C.U.M. Manifesto and attempted assassin of Andy Warhol, died in room 202 of the Hotel Bristol, 56 Mason Street, San Francisco. Richard Ramirez (a.k.a. Night Stalker) stayed in the same hotel, room 315, during his killing spree in 1985. The comedy film What's Up, Doc? (1972), starring Barbra Streisand and Ryan O'Neal, features the Hilton Hotel as the "Hotel Bristol, San Francisco". The famous Black Cat Bar was originally in the basement of this building, then named the Athens Hotel, from 1906 to 1921. The Black Cat was later located in North Beach at 710 Montgomery Street in San Francisco.
- The Hotel Bristol, Oslo, was where, in November 1939, Hans Ferdinand Mayer "a German scientist, who is on your side" wrote the Oslo Report, a major leak of technical information passed to the British.
- Hotel Bristol, Warsaw opened in 1901 on Krakowskie Przedmieście. Thoroughly refurbished in its original style in the 1990s it was reopened by Margaret Thatcher, an event that forms the final chapter of her memoirs.
- Hotel Bristol (Berlin) opened in 1891 and was destroyed in an air raid in 1943. It held the first international IAA (Internationale Automobil-Ausstellung) motor show, in 1897, and was involved in the Krupp scandal, detailed in William Manchester's book on the arms manufacturer.
- The five-star luxury hotel in Vienna opposite the Vienna State Opera House is one of the most exclusive hotels in Austria and was restructured by the hotelier Georg Hochfilzer. It has hosted many historical figures including Teddy Roosevelt. It was here that the Prince of Wales and Wallis Simpson sojourned at the height of their affair, in 1936; the most sumptuous suite is named after him. In 1938, the hotel underwent Aryanization when its Jewish owner Samuel Schallinger was forced to sell his shares before being deported to Theresienstadt concentration camp where he died.
- Leon Trotsky was accused of meeting with others to plot against Stalin in the Hotel Bristol (Copenhagen). An alibi was established in 1937 when the Dewey Commission showed that the hotel had burned down in 1917.
- The Le Bristol Hotel (Beirut), is one of the most exclusive hotels in Beirut where the Lebanese Independence from the occupying Syrian military force was prepared in 2005.

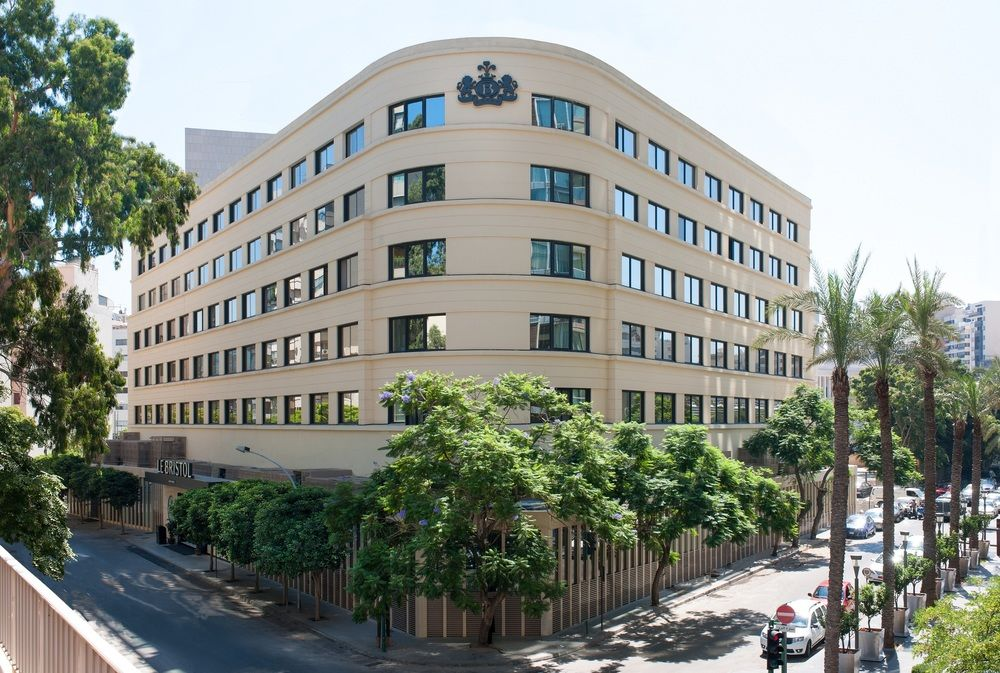
Bristol Hotel in Beirut

- Hotel Bristol, Belgrade, opened in 1912; the architectural characteristics of the building are highly regarded: it is qualified as an anthological example of the modern architecture in Belgrade and the pinnacle of the Secession architecture in the city. It was declared a cultural monument in 1987.

== Notable hotels called Bristol Hotel or Hotel Bristol ==
- Bristol Hotel, Mar del Plata, Argentina
- Hotel Bristol, Sarajevo, Bosnia and Herzegovina
- Hotel Bristol (Copenhagen), Denmark
- Hôtel Le Bristol Paris, France
- Hotel Bristol (Berlin), Germany
- Bristol Hotel, Gibraltar
- Le Bristol Hotel Beirut, Lebanon
- Hotel Bristol (Oslo), Norway
- Hotel Bristol, Warsaw, Poland
- Hotel Bristol, Belgrade, Serbia
- Bristol Hotel, Odesa, Ukraine
