= Hotel Bristol (Copenhagen) =

Hotel in Copenhagen, Denmark

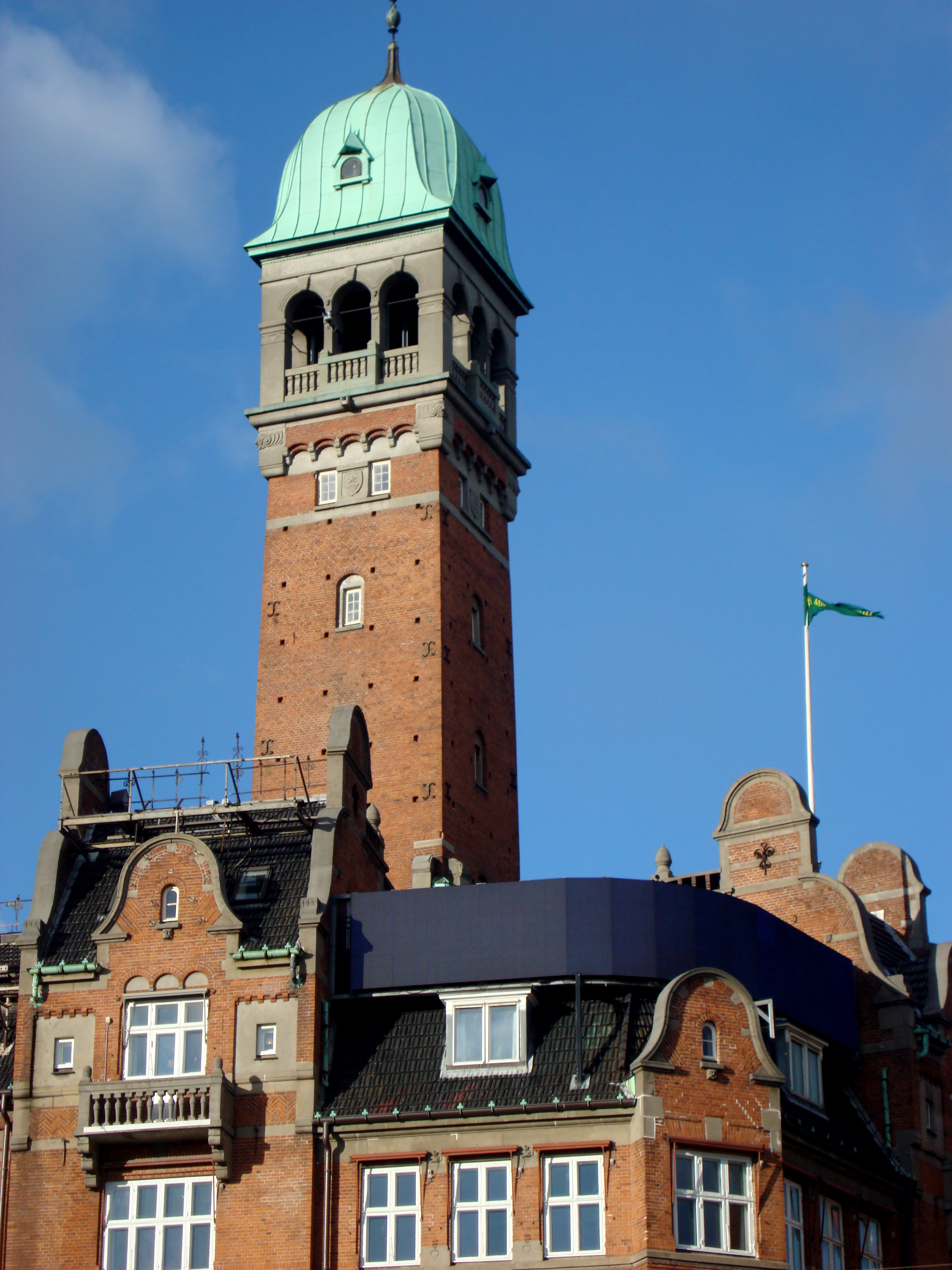
- The tower of Hotel Bristol
- Interactive map of the Hotel Bristol area

General information
- Architectural style: Historicism
- Location: City Hall Square, Copenhagen, Denmark
- Construction started: 1901
- Completed: 1902

Height
- Height: 50 m (160 ft)

Design and construction
- Architect: Vilhelm Fischer

Hotel Bristol, also known as Absalons Gaard after a later owner, is a former hotel located on the City Hall Square in Copenhagen, Denmark.

== History ==
=== As a hotel ===
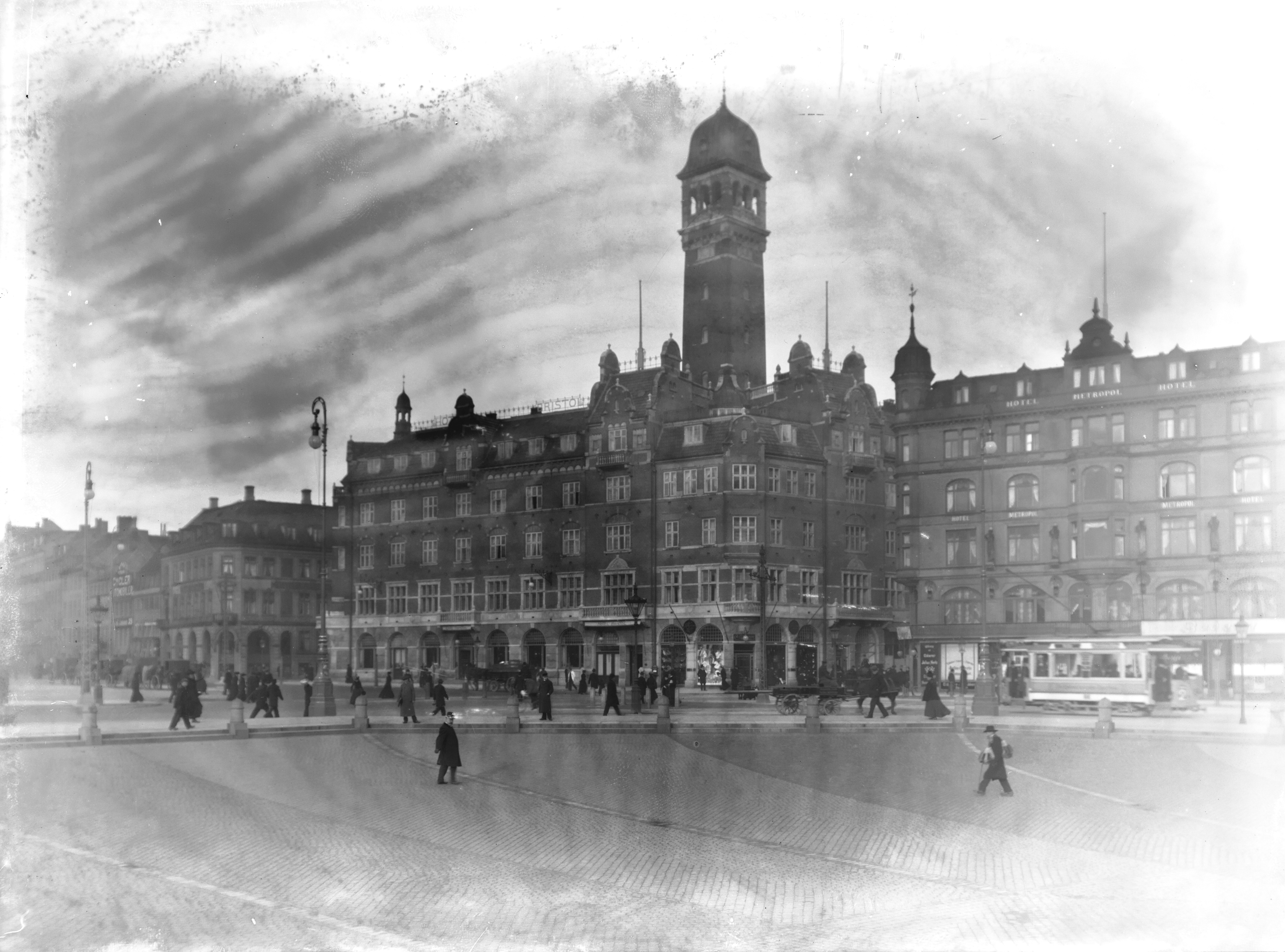
Hotel Bristol photographed by Frederik Riise

Hotel Bristol was built in two stages. The first two wings, along the City Hall Square and Frederiksberggade, were designed by the architect Vilhelm Fischer, who won an architectural competition, and built from 1901 to 1902 as Hotel Bristol. In 1932, a third wing, designed by Waldemar Schmidt, was built along Vestergade.

The Hotel Bristol closed in 1917 after a bankruptcy caused by a fire.

=== Later occupants ===
After the closure, the building became the new headquarters of Absalon, an insurance company founded in 1909, and changed its name to Absalons Gård (en. House of Absalon). Later the newspaper Aktuelt was based there.

== Architecture ==
The three-wing building is constructed in red brick with granite rustication on the ground storey. The most distinctive feature of the building is its tower which stands 50 metres tall and is capped by a copper roof.

== Trotsky and Hotel Bristol ==
Hotel Bristol provided Leon Trotsky with an alibi following his 1936 Show Trial. Trotsky was accused of plotting against Joseph Stalin at the cafe of the Bristol in Copenhagen where E. S Golzman confessed to meeting both him and his son Sergei Sedov. Danish newspapers could afterwards report that the hotel had been closed since the fire in 1917. The details have been laid out in 'Leon Trotsky and the Hotel Bristol That Never Was', chapter 9, in High Times at the Hotel Bristol, a book about incidents at Hotel Bristol around the world.

== Other incidents ==
- The internationally renowned Danish actor Valdemar Psilander died in the hotel while he stayed there as a guest in 1917.
