= Hotel Bristol (Oslo) =

Hotel in Oslo, Norway

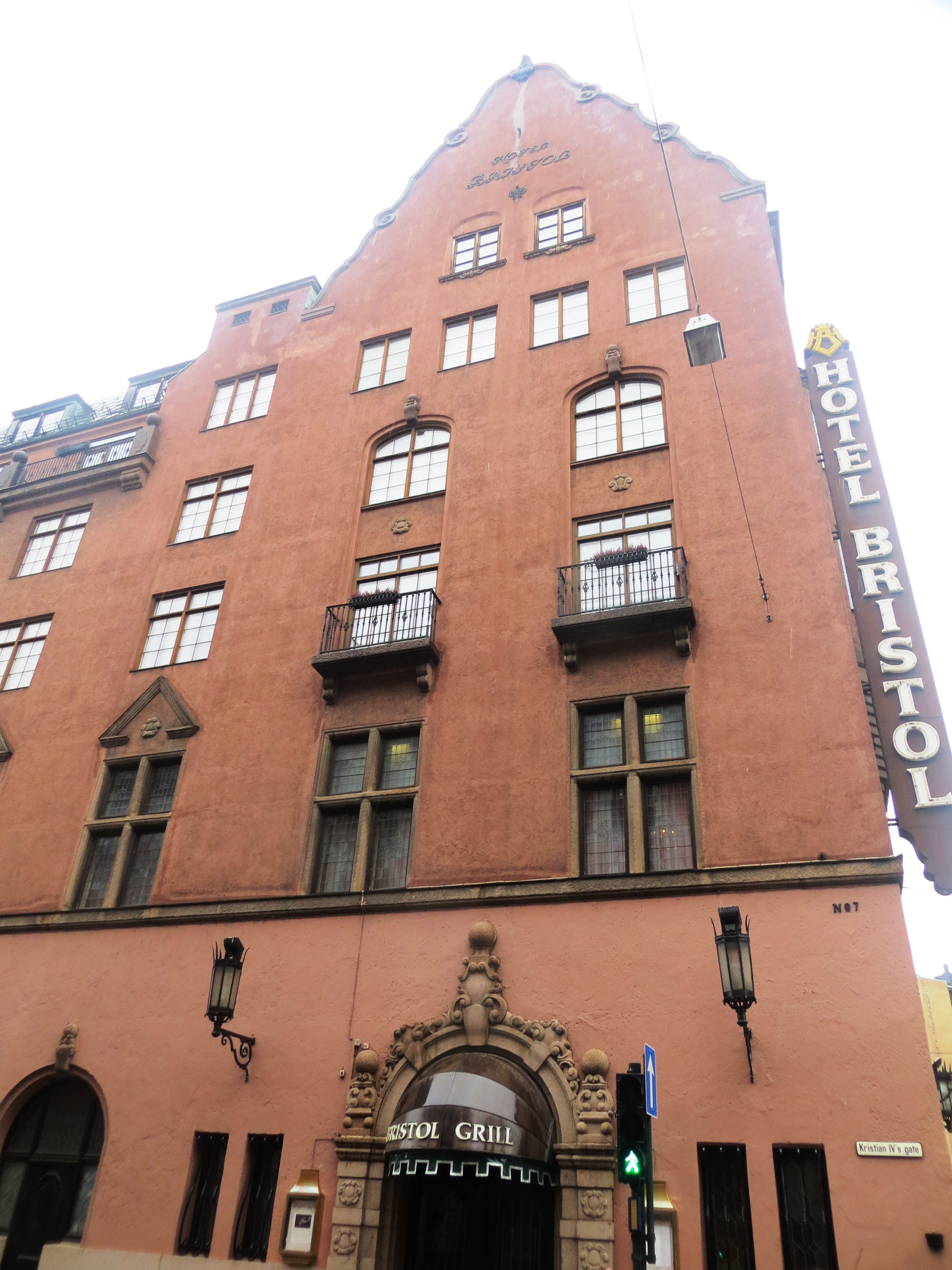

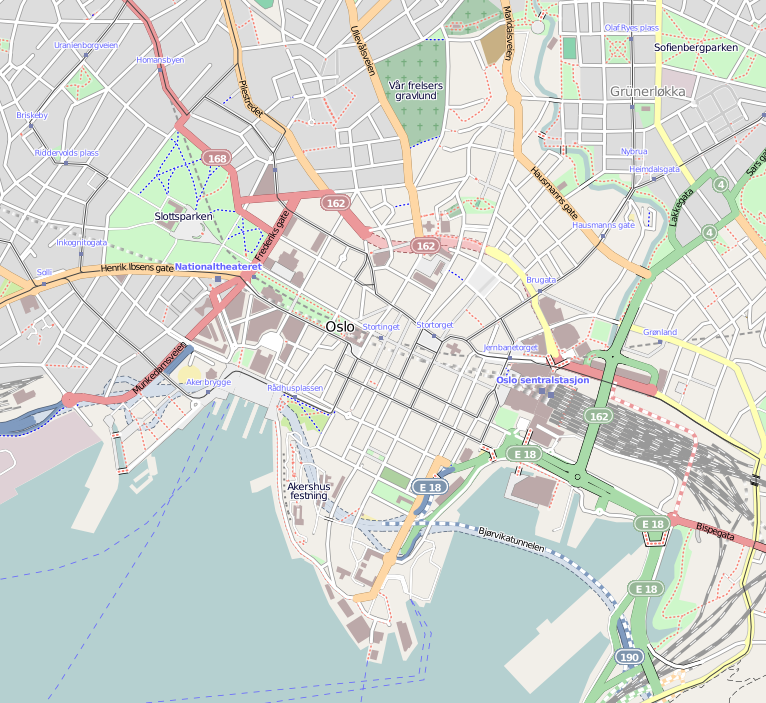
- Location within Central Oslo

General information
- Location: Karl Johans gate, Oslo, Norway
- Coordinates: 59°54′54″N 10°44′23″E
- Opening: 1920
- Owner: Olav Thon

Other information
- Number of rooms: 251
- Number of suites: 10
- Number of restaurants: 3

Hotel Bristol is a hotel in Oslo, Norway. Opened in 1920, it is owned today by Olav Thon. The hotel has 251 rooms, 10 suites, and three restaurants.

On the evening of July 15, 1936, the city of Oslo hosted, at the hotel, a dinner for participants in the 1936 International Congress of Mathematicians.

In 1939, the Oslo Report was written by Hans Ferdinand Mayer during his stay at the hotel. During World War II, the hotel was requisitioned as a hospital to treat casualties from the December 1943 explosion of a German munitions ship in Oslo's harbor.

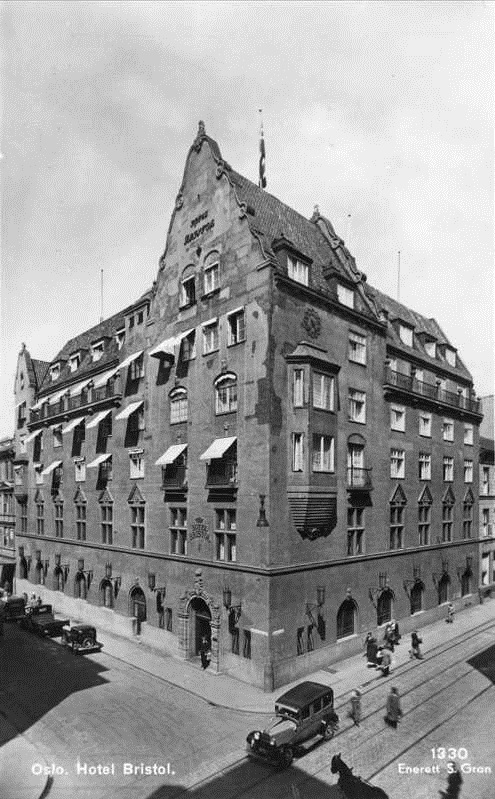
Hotel Bristol, 1930

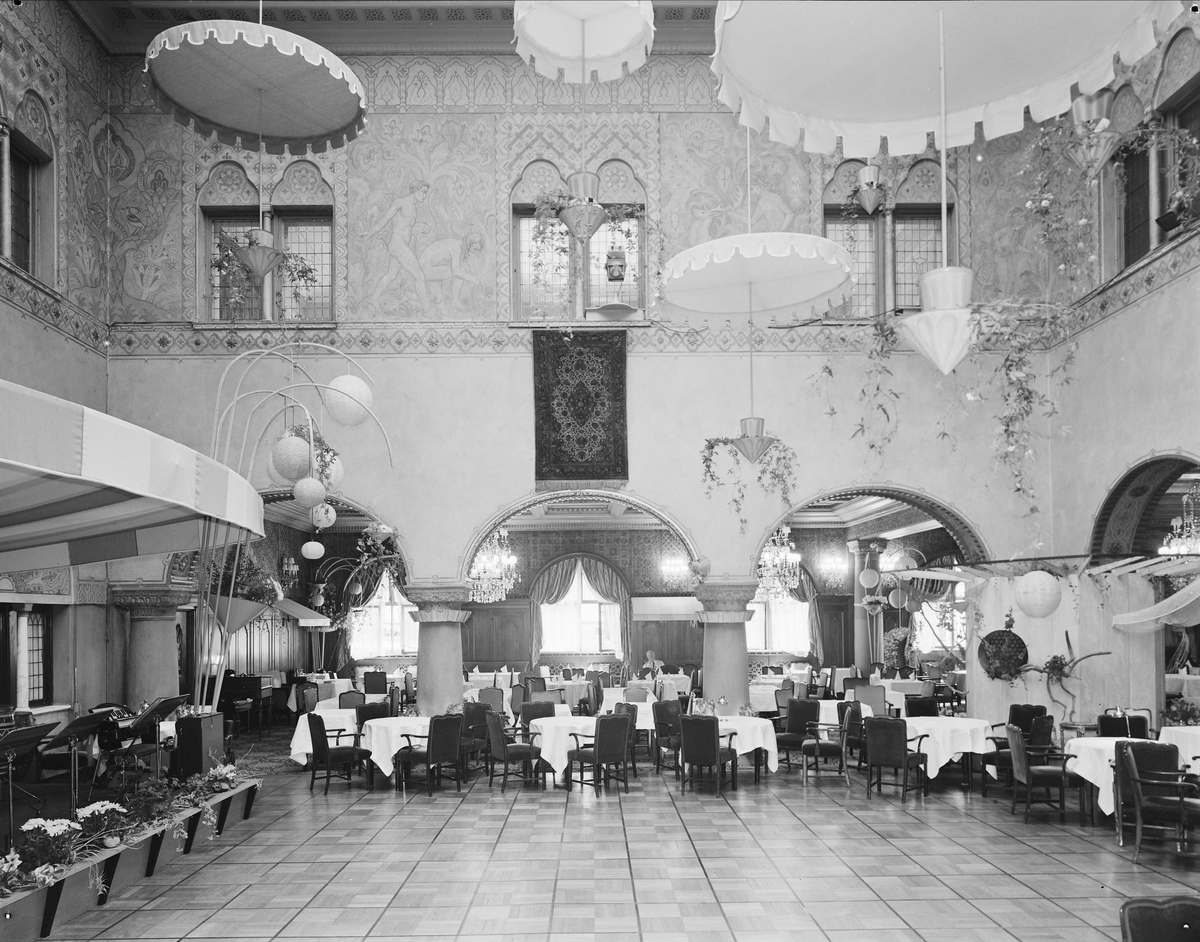
Hotel Bristol, Moorish Hall, 1959

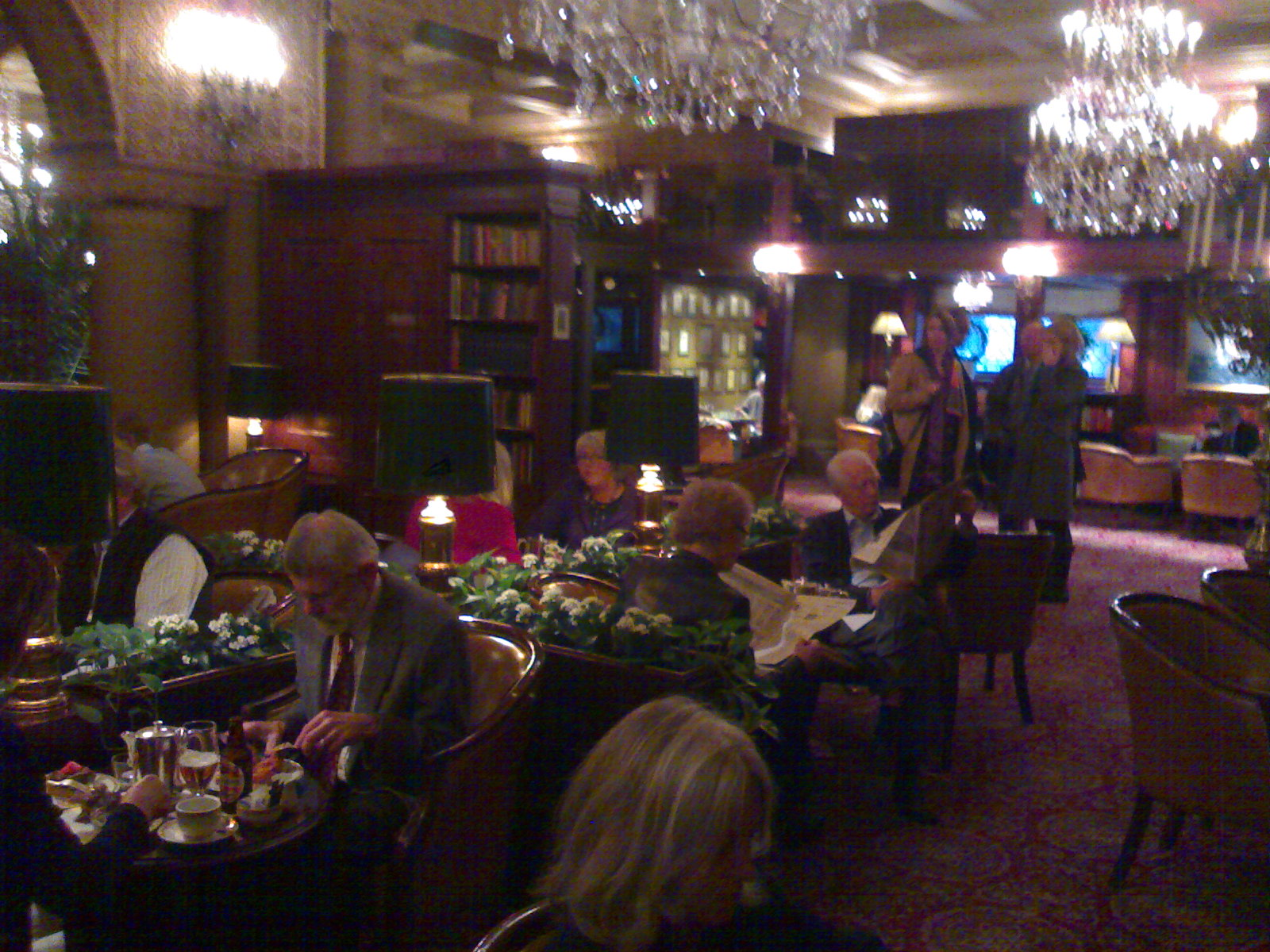
Hotel restaurant

== See also ==
- Hotel Bristol
