= Georg Hochfilzer =

Austrian businessman

Georg Hochfilzer is an Austrian businessman. He is the former general manager of the Westgate Hotel in San Diego, one of 257 Leading Hotels of the World, from which he retired in 2008.

Over the past 20 years, Hochfilzer has managed hotels such as Germany's Hotel Schwarzer Bock and Vienna's Hotel Bristol. He has worked at Le Grand, a five-star deluxe hotel in Paris, the Queen Elizabeth Montreal, the Beverly Hilton Hotel and The Newporter Inn.

Hochfilzer co-created the Fairbanks Ranch Country Club located in Rancho Santa Fe, California. While at Fairbanks, he organized the Olympian Equestrian event.
