= Władysław Marconi =

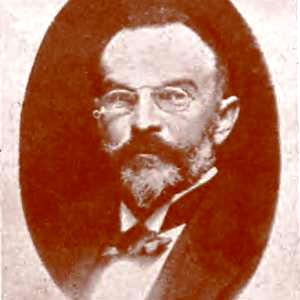
Władysław Marconi

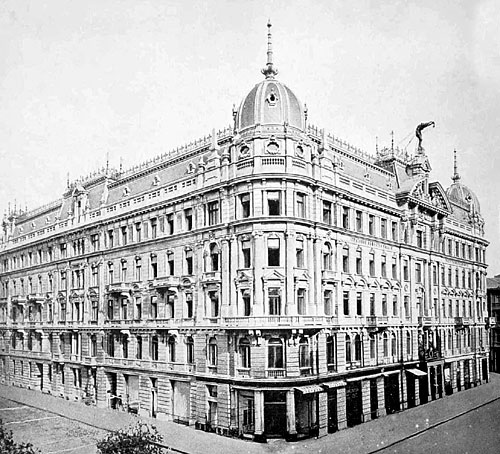
The Office of the Credit Company "Russia" in Warsaw

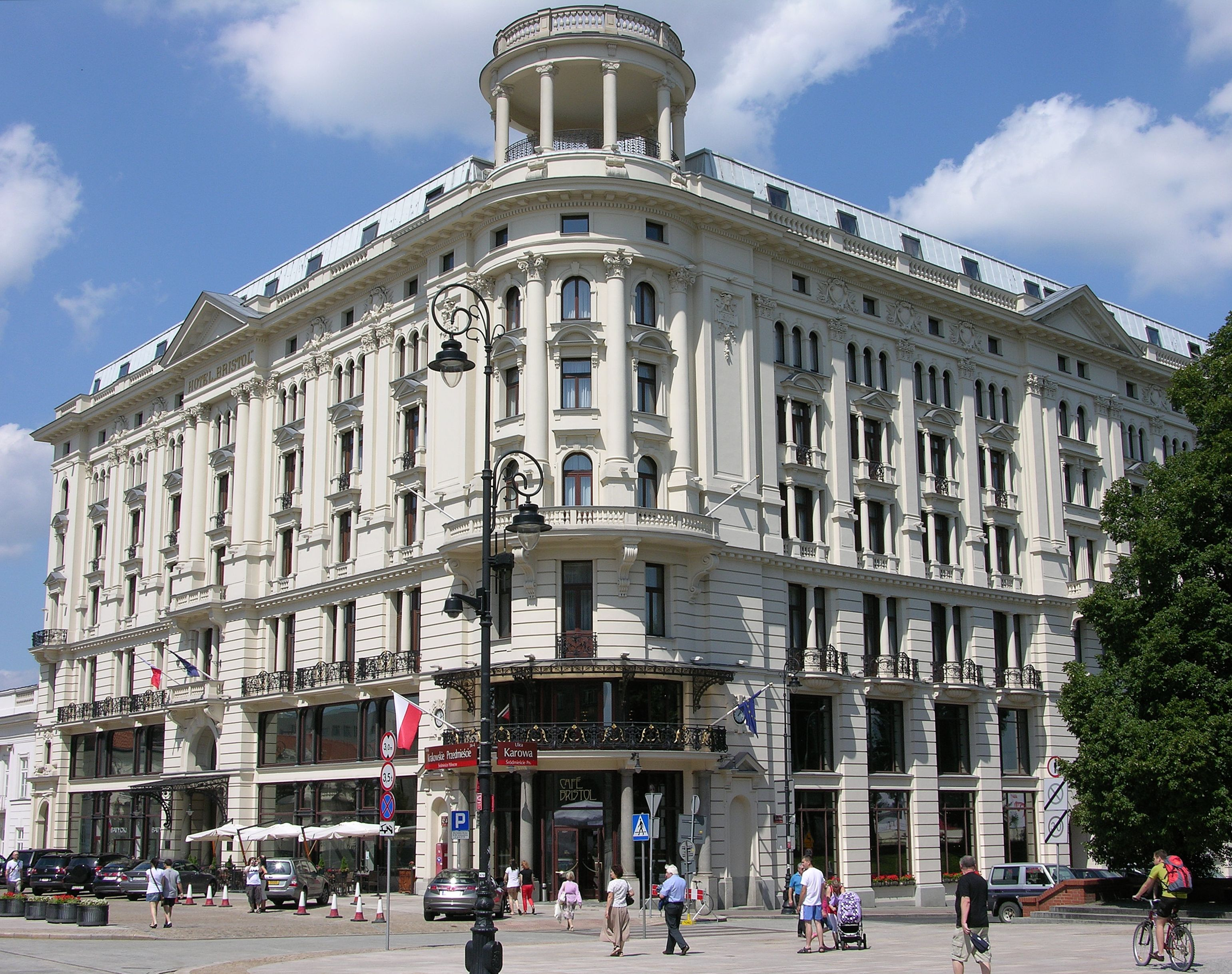
Hotel Bristol in Warsaw's Krakowskie Przedmieście

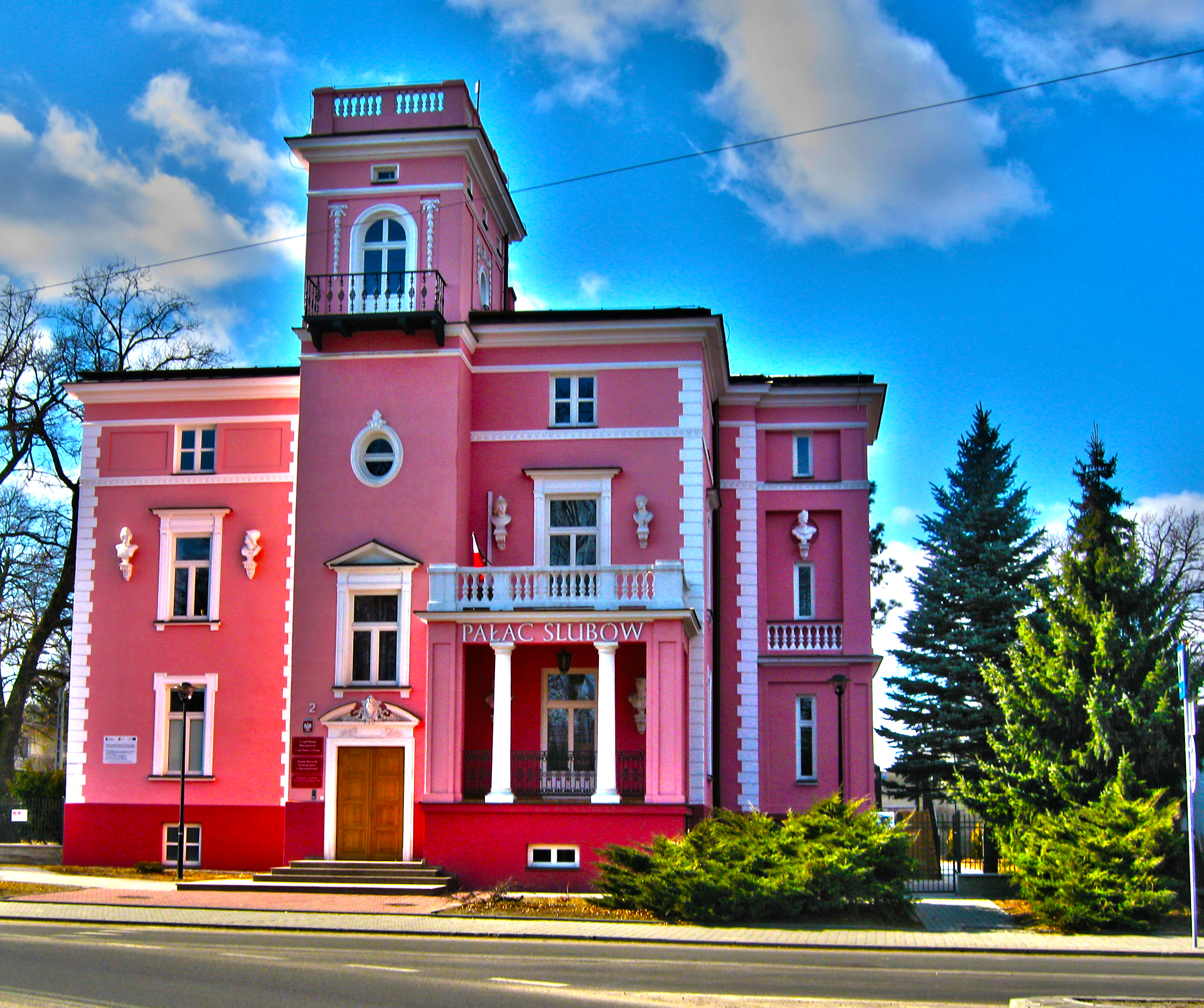
The Kozłowski Residence in Skierniewice

Władysław Marconi (29 February 1848 in Warsaw - 4 June 1915 in Warsaw) was a Polish architect and son of Enrico Marconi and Margaret Heiton, who came from a Scottish family settled in Poland. He was raised by his mother as a Calvinist.

After completing his studies in 1874 at the Imperial Academy of Arts in Saint Petersburg, he returned to Warsaw where he started his career and took part in numerous social and cultural activities. He was a co-founder of the Society for the Care of Monuments of the Past, the Circle of Architects and the construction committee for Poniatowski Bridge. He was also a member of the Warsaw Photographic Society.

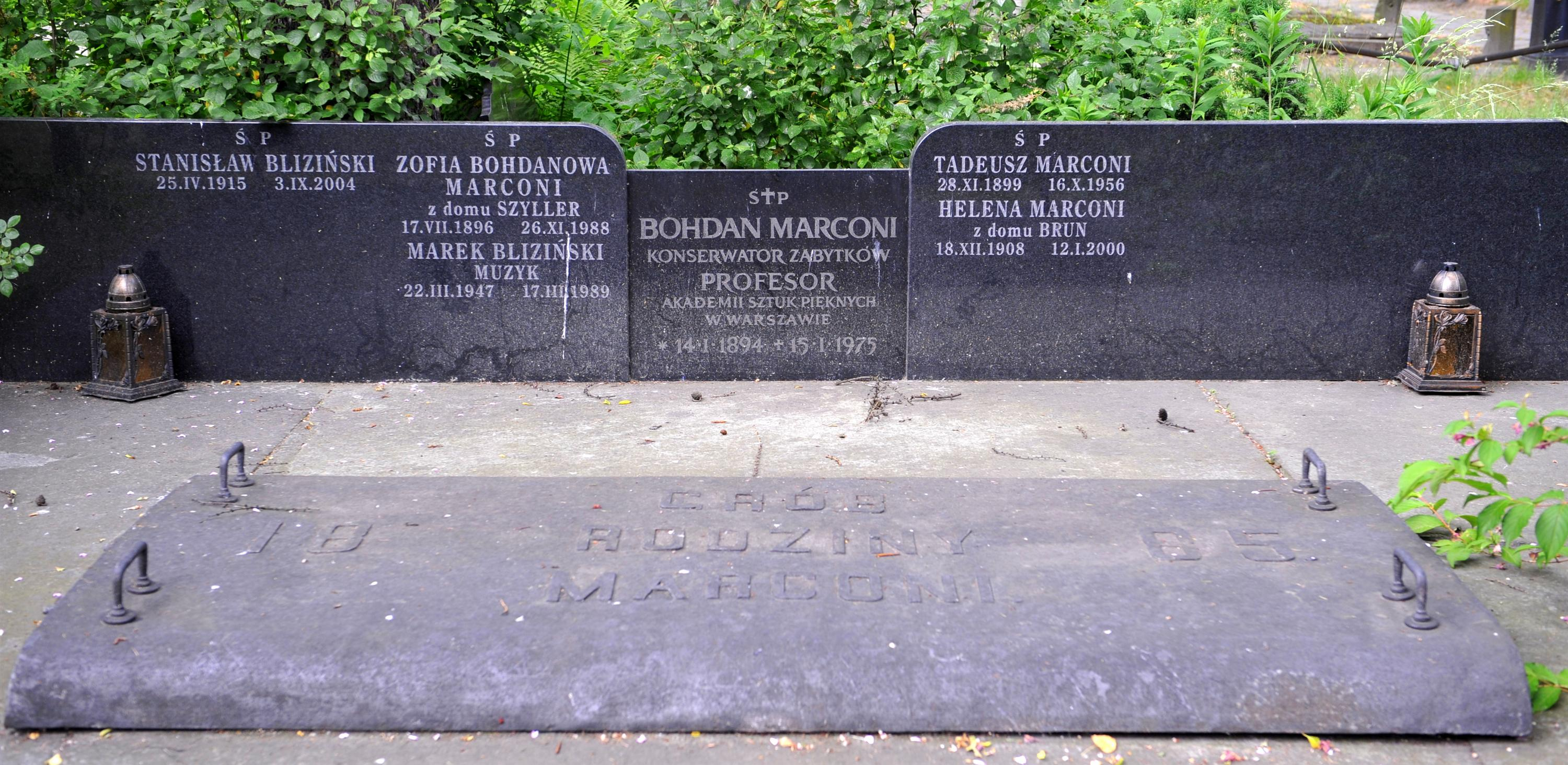
The tomb of the Marconi family at the Protestant Reformed Cemetery in Warsaw.

== Links ==
- Władysław Marconi w serwisie Warszawa1939.pl (in Polish)
