= Hotel Bristol, Warsaw =

Hotel in Warsaw, opened 1901

Coordinates: 52°14′32″N 21°0′58″E

Hotel Bristol
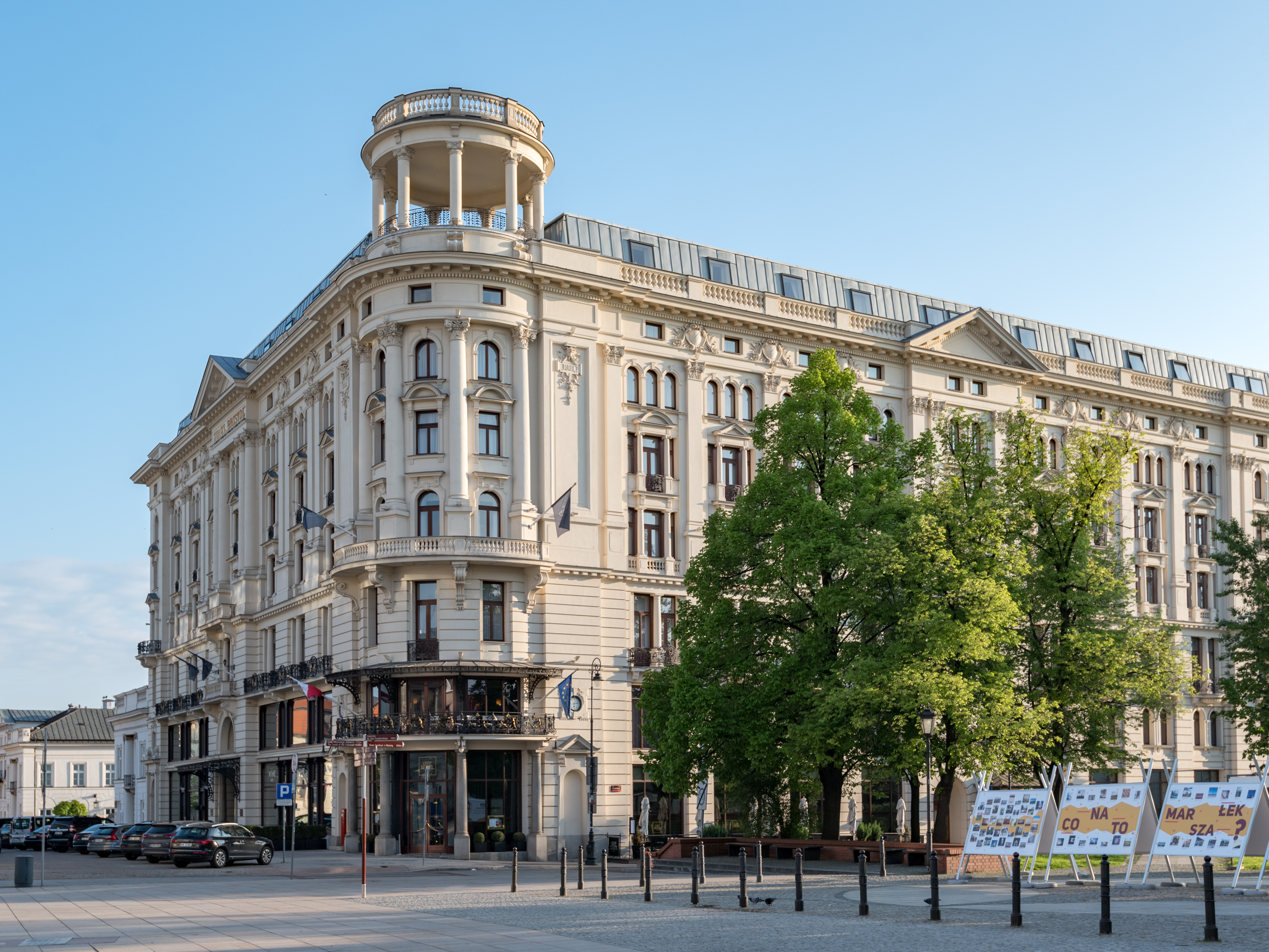
- Hotel Bristol, Warsaw (2017)

General information
- Architectural style: Neo-Renaissance
- Location: Warsaw, Poland, Krakowskie Przedmiescie 42/44
- Opening: November 19, 1901
- Owner: Towarzystwo Akcyjne Budowy i Prowadzenia Hotelów, (1901-1928), Bank Cukrownictwa (1928-1948), City of Warsaw (1947-1952), Orbis (1952-1977), University of Warsaw (1977-1981), Orbis (1981-2011), Rosmarinum Investments (2011-)
- Operator: Marriott International

Design and construction
- Architect: Władysław Marconi

Other information
- Number of rooms: 165
- Number of suites: 41

Website
- www.hotelbristolwarsaw.pl

Historic Monument of Poland
- Designated: 1994-09-08
- Part of: Warsaw – historic city center with the Royal Route and Wilanów
- Reference no.: M.P. 1994 nr 50 poz. 423

Hotel Bristol, Warsaw is a historic five-star luxury hotel built in the Neo-Renaissance style and opened in 1901 in Warsaw, Poland. It is located in the city centre on Krakowskie Przedmieście next to the Presidential Palace.

The hotel is one of the most notable historic monuments of the Royal Route (Polish: Trakt Królewski) and remains among the few landmarks of Warsaw which emerged relatively unscathed from the city's near total destruction during World War II. It is considered one of Warsaw's oldest and one of the country's most luxurious hotels.

== History ==
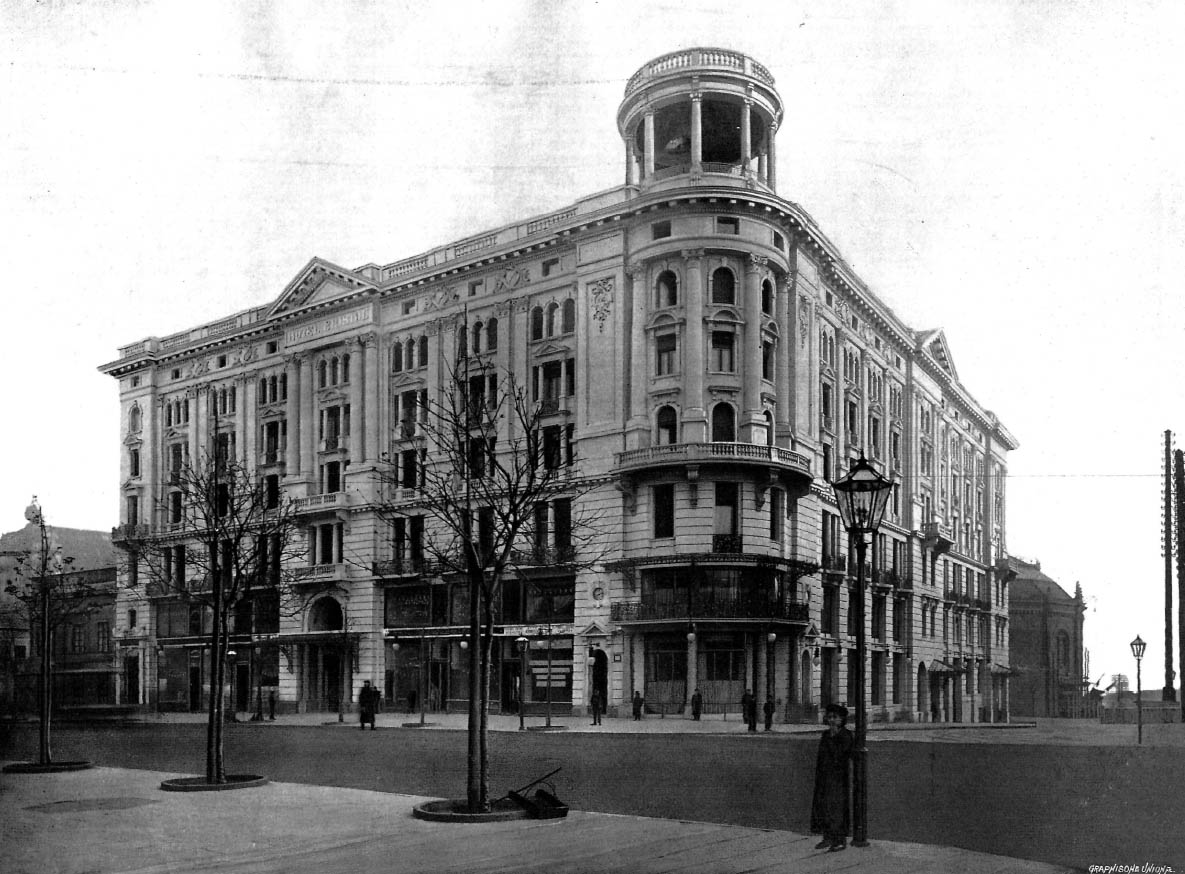
Hotel Bristol in 1901

=== Early Years ===
The site was formerly occupied by the Tarnowski Palace, which was sold in 1895 to a company consisting of Polish pianist Ignacy Jan Paderewski, his lawyer Stanisław Roszkowski, and their partner Edmund Zaremba. In 1897, Roszkowski suggested Paderewski develop the site with a world-class luxury hotel, as an investment property. In 1898, the partners built a rotunda on an open part of the site, where panoramic paintings were displayed to the public. Zaremba left the company soon after. Meanwhile, Roszkowski continued to seek investors for the proposed hotel, which would cost 2 million rubles, an astronomical sum at a time, when the entire city of Warsaw's annual budget was only twice that. Roszowski eventually formed an investing company to build the hotel. Paderewski bought the majority of the 4000 shares, at 250 rubles each, and donated the property to the hotel company. The palace was demolished in 1898 and Karowa Street was widened, to allow for construction.

A competition was held for the design of the hotel, and Krakow architects Tadeusz Stryjeński and Franciszek Mączyński won with their Art Nouveau design. However the builders soon decided to change the style to a Neo-Renaissance design, and brought in architect Władysław Marconi, whose father Enrico Marconi had designed the adjacent Hotel Europejski, to significantly amend the design. The hotel's interiors were designed by noted Viennese architect Otto Wagner Jr. The cornerstone was laid on April 22, 1899 and the structure was completed in April 1900. Fitting out the interiors took a further sixteen months. The hotel contained 200 rooms, 20 with private bathrooms. The Cafe Bristol opened first, on October 22, 1901, while the hotel was dedicated on November 17, 1901 and opened to guests on November 19, 1901. Among the notable features of the newly-built hotel was the country's first elevator. The hotel also housed the photo studio of Jadwiga Golcz which was frequented by many well-known artists of the time.

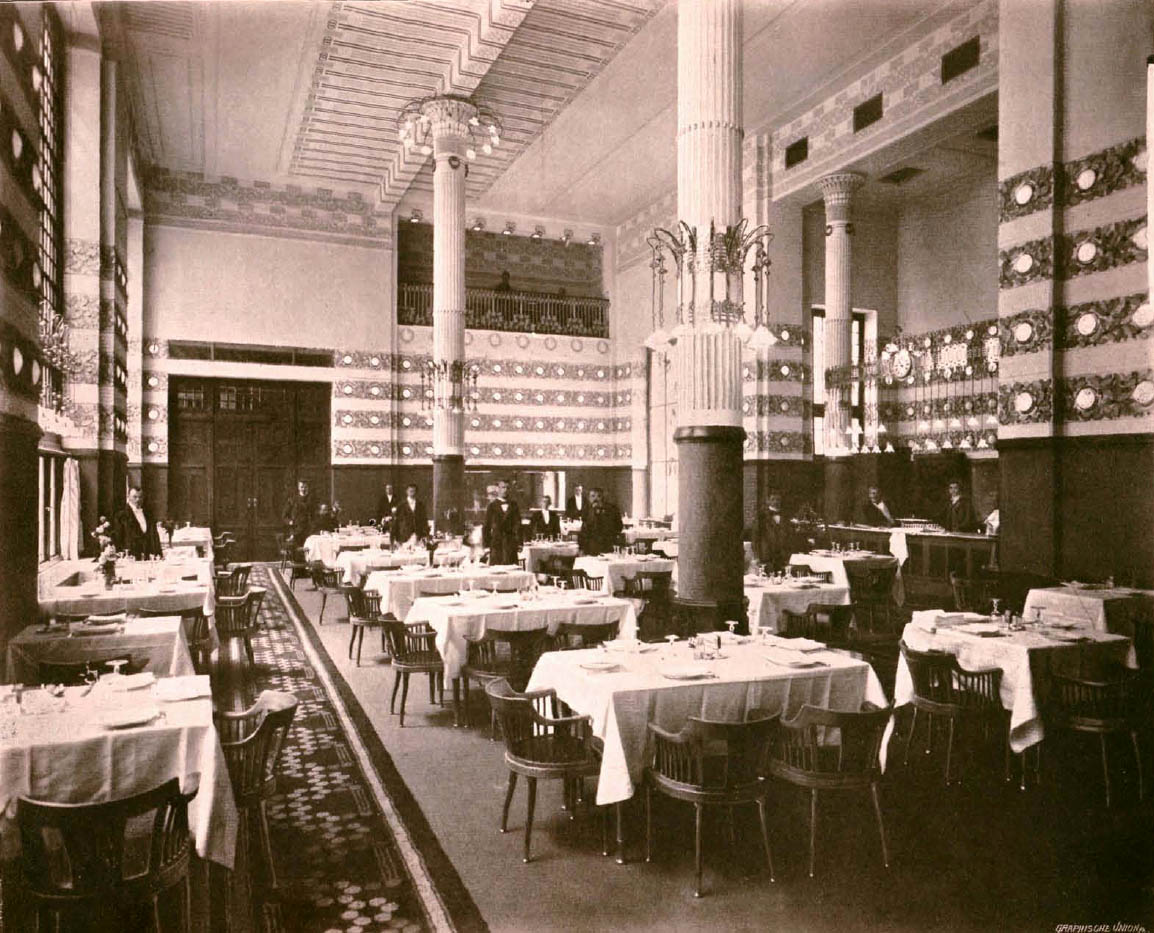
Elegant Cafe Bristol designed by Otto Wagner Jr., 1901

When the Hotel Bristol opened, Paderewski's new lawyer, Tadeusz Jentys became president of the hotel company and soon after manager of the hotel as well. Jentys owned 431 shares of the hotel and also controlled Paderewski's remaining 1610 shares. The hotel was requisitioned by the occupying German Army during World War I. After Poland gained its independence, Paderewski returned in triumph to Warsaw on January 2, 1919 and spoke from the balcony of the hotel. He became Prime Minister of the Republic of Poland and held the first session of a sovereign Polish parliament at the hotel on February 10, 1919. Paderewski's government fell by the end of the year and he resigned on December 10, 1919, while living in the hotel. He left Warsaw for Switzerland in February 1920 and instructed Jentys to sell his interest in the hotel. However, with the Polish–Soviet War raging, that proved impossible, and the hotel was briefly requisitioned by the Polish Army. In 1923, Jentys asked Paderewski to borrow 3 million Swiss francs, to cover renovations to the hotel, but Padereski refused. Jentys then approached Prince Seweryn Czetwertyński, main shareholder of the Hotel Europejski, the Bristol's rival across the street, but Czetwertyński refused as well. Finally, in February 1928, Jentys successfully sold all of Paderewski's shares in the hotel to the Poznań-based Bank Cukrownictwa (Sugar Industry Bank).

=== Bank ownership ===
The Bank Cukrownictwa initially intended to convert the aging hotel into their Warsaw offices, but eventually decided to build a new adjoining office building. From 1928-1931, the hotel's interiors were gutted and modernized in the Art Deco style by designer Antoni Jawornicki. All 250 rooms had running water installed and 80 rooms had bathrooms added. In 1935, the hotel hosted heads of state and dignitaries from around the world for the funeral of Marshal Józef Piłsudski. That same year, the hotel assumed direct operation of the restaurant, which had been run by a concessionaire who went bankrupt during the Great Depression. In 1937, the dining rooms were renovated. In the 1930s, one of the hotel rooms on the fifth floor served as an atelier of painter Wojciech Kossak.

Upon the German invasion in 1939, the hotel was made into the headquarters of the Chief of the Warsaw District. It miraculously survived the war and the devastation of the city during the Warsaw Uprising relatively unscathed, standing nearly alone among the rubble of its neighborhood. Following the war, the hotel was repaired and reopened in 1945.

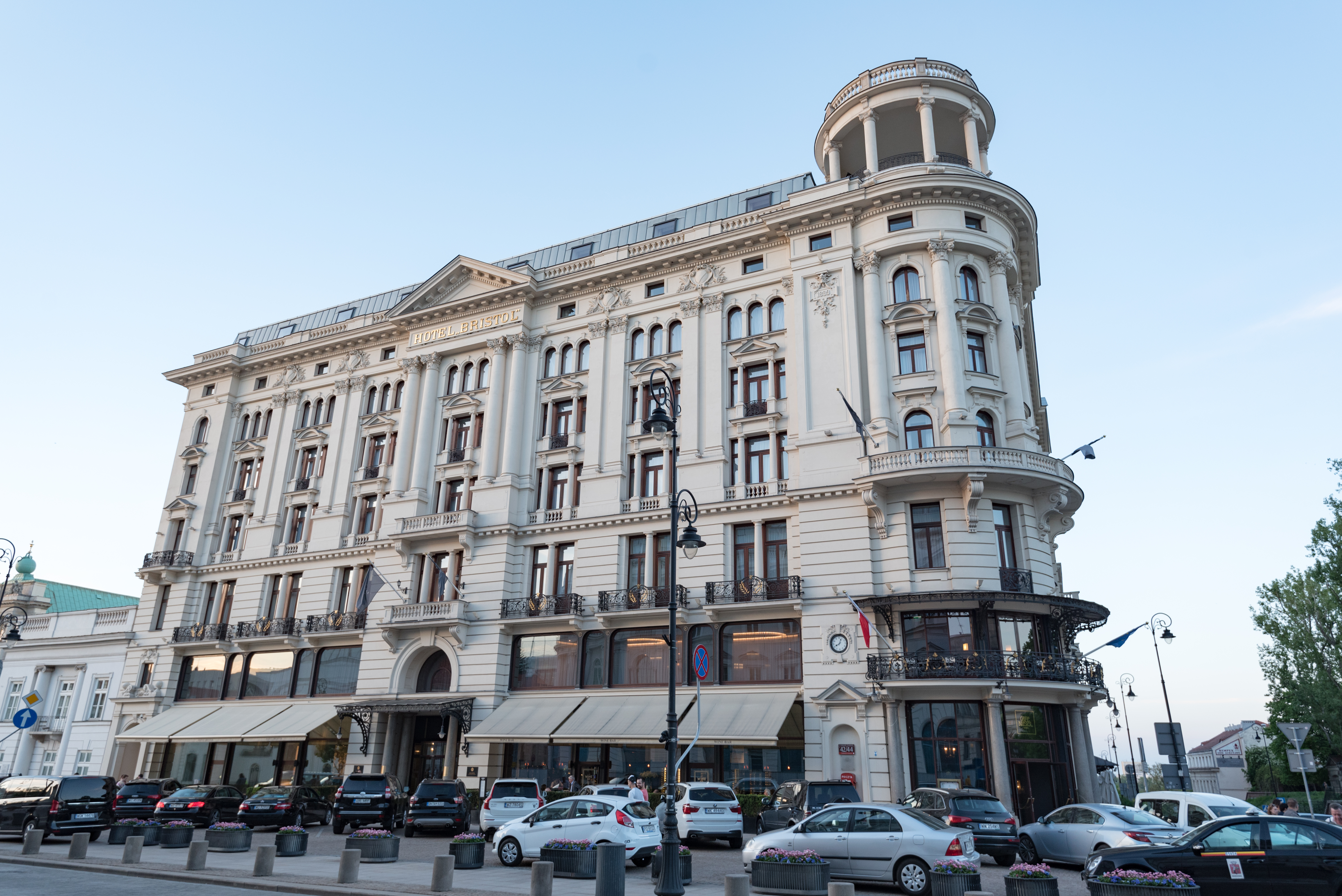
The façade of the hotel seen from Krakowskie Przedmieście

=== Government ownership ===
On September 26, 1947, the City of Warsaw took over operation of the hotel, just after the completion of renovation work costing 140 million złotys. Because public funds were used for the work, in July 1948 the hotel was seized from the Bank Cukrownictwa and fully nationalized by the Polish communist government.

On September 29, 1948, Israel’s embassy to Poland opened in the hotel, the state of Israel’s first diplomatic mission anywhere in the world.

In 1952, the Polish People's Republic was officially founded and the hotel was placed under the control of the state-run Orbis travel and tourism monopoly, exclusively serving visitors from abroad. The public rooms were redecorated by Stanisław Miedza-Tomaszewski in an attempt to recreate the original Art Nouveau decor. In 1963 Orbis joined the Bristol and Europejski under one management, to share costs between the two hotels. In 1965, the hotel was inscribed onto the Registry of Cultural Property. In the late 1960s, Prime Minister Józef Cyrankiewicz allocated 90 million złotys to renovating the hotel, but the work was never begun.

By the 1970s, the Bristol's outdated facilities had seen it demoted to second class ranking by the government, and with the construction of more modern hotels nearby, it was used mainly to house visitors from other Eastern Bloc countries. The hotel was donated by Prime Minister Piotr Jaroszewicz to the University of Warsaw in 1977 to eventually serve as their library. It continued operating until it closed in November 1981. The hotel's furnishings were transferred across the street to the Europejski. No remodeling work was ever done and the building languished empty for a decade, through the waning days of the Communist government.

=== Restoration ===
After the fall of Communism in 1989, the British Forte Hotels chain signed an agreement with Orbis in 1990, giving them a 55% stake in the hotel, and a management contract for it. Starting in February 1991, the hotel was completely restored to its former glory. The building was gutted and modernized, a seventh floor was added on top, a copy of the original cage elevator was built, and the original interiors of the public rooms were recreated by Vienna-based designer Ivan Zelenka to match the 1901 designs.

The Hotel Bristol began receiving overnight guests again on December 5, 1992 and Baroness Margaret Thatcher officially reopened the hotel in a ceremony on April 17, 1993. From 1998 to 2013, the hotel was part of the Le Méridien hotel chain and was known as Le Royal Méridien Bristol. The exterior was further restored in 2005, and the interior redecorated in 2013, after which the hotel joined The Luxury Collection. Currently, the hotel offers 165 rooms as well as 41 suites.

== Famous guests ==
Throughout its long history, the Hotel Bristol was visited by a number of prominent guests from all over the world, some of which include:

- AC/DC
- Woody Allen
- Paul Anka
- Eugeniusz Bodo
- George H. W. Bush
- José Carreras
- Enrico Caruso
- Naomi Campbell
- Ray Charles
- Jacques Chirac
- Marie Curie
- Dalai Lama
- Gerard Depardieu
- Marlene Dietrich
- Elizabeth II
- Margot Fonteyn
- Dave Gahan
- Bill Gates
- Günter Grass
- Edvard Grieg
- Nâzım Hikmet
- Herbert Hoover
- Mick Jagger
- John Fitzgerald Kennedy
- Jan Kiepura
- Helmut Kohl
- Sophia Loren
- Paul McCartney
- Angela Merkel
- Pablo Neruda
- Jacqueline Kennedy Onassis
- Ignacy Jan Paderewski
- Pablo Picasso
- Józef Piłsudski
- Michel Platini
- Lana Del Rey
- Lionel Richie
- Artur Rubinstein
- Richard Strauss
- Karol Szymanowski
- Wisława Szymborska
- Margaret Thatcher
- Tina Turner

== Gallery ==
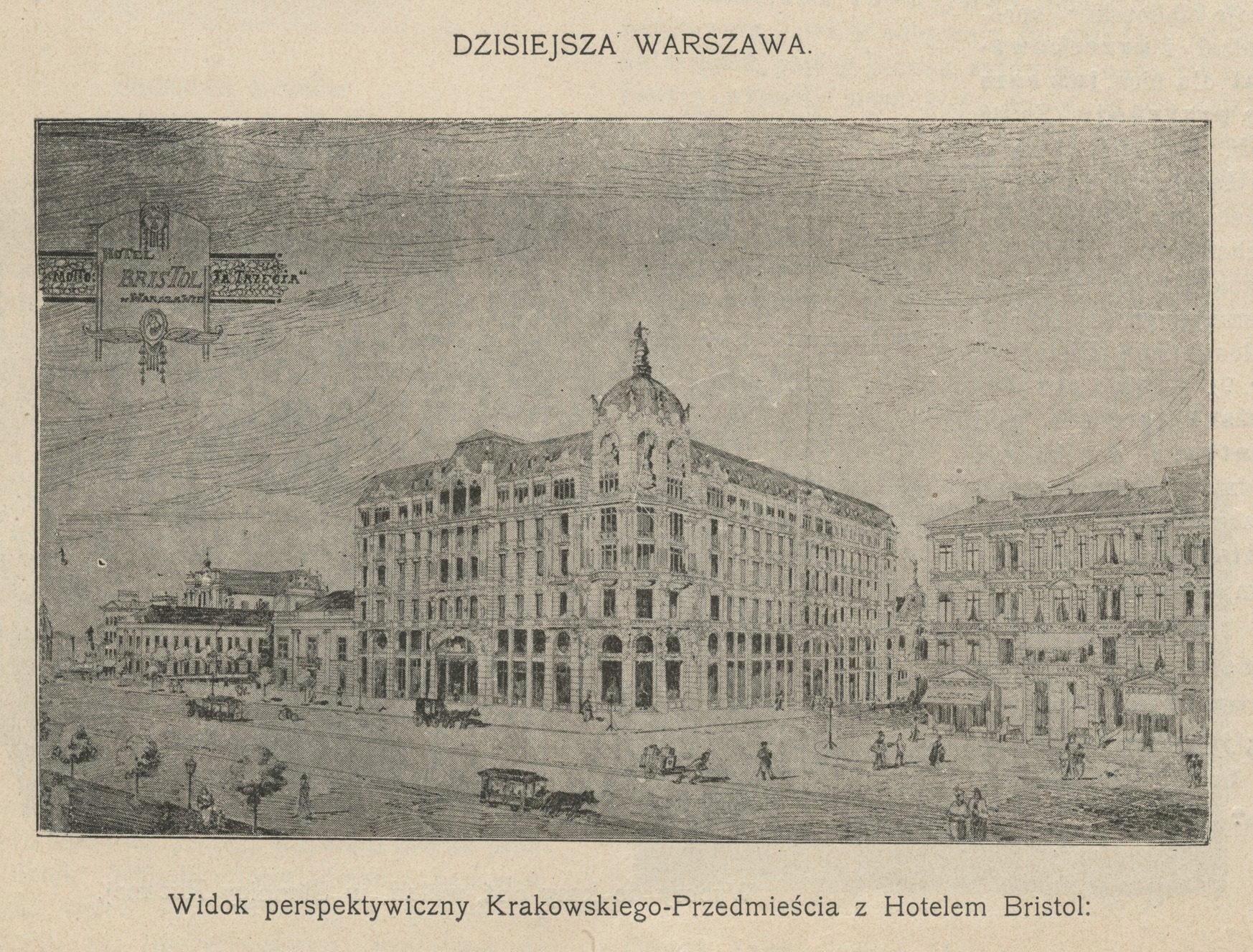
Original rejected Art Nouveau exterior design of the Hotel Bristol

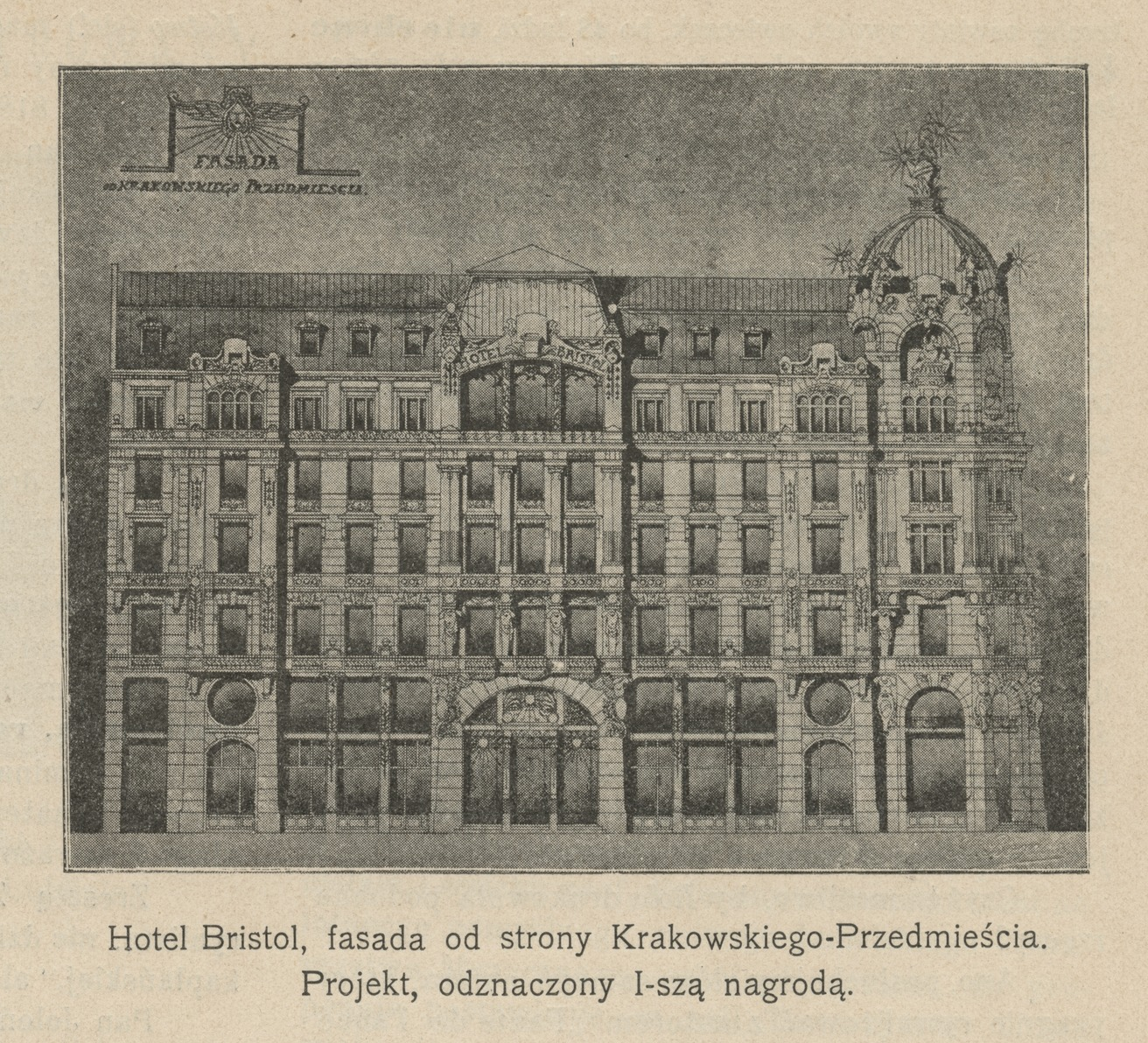
Original rejected Art Nouveau exterior design of the Hotel Bristol

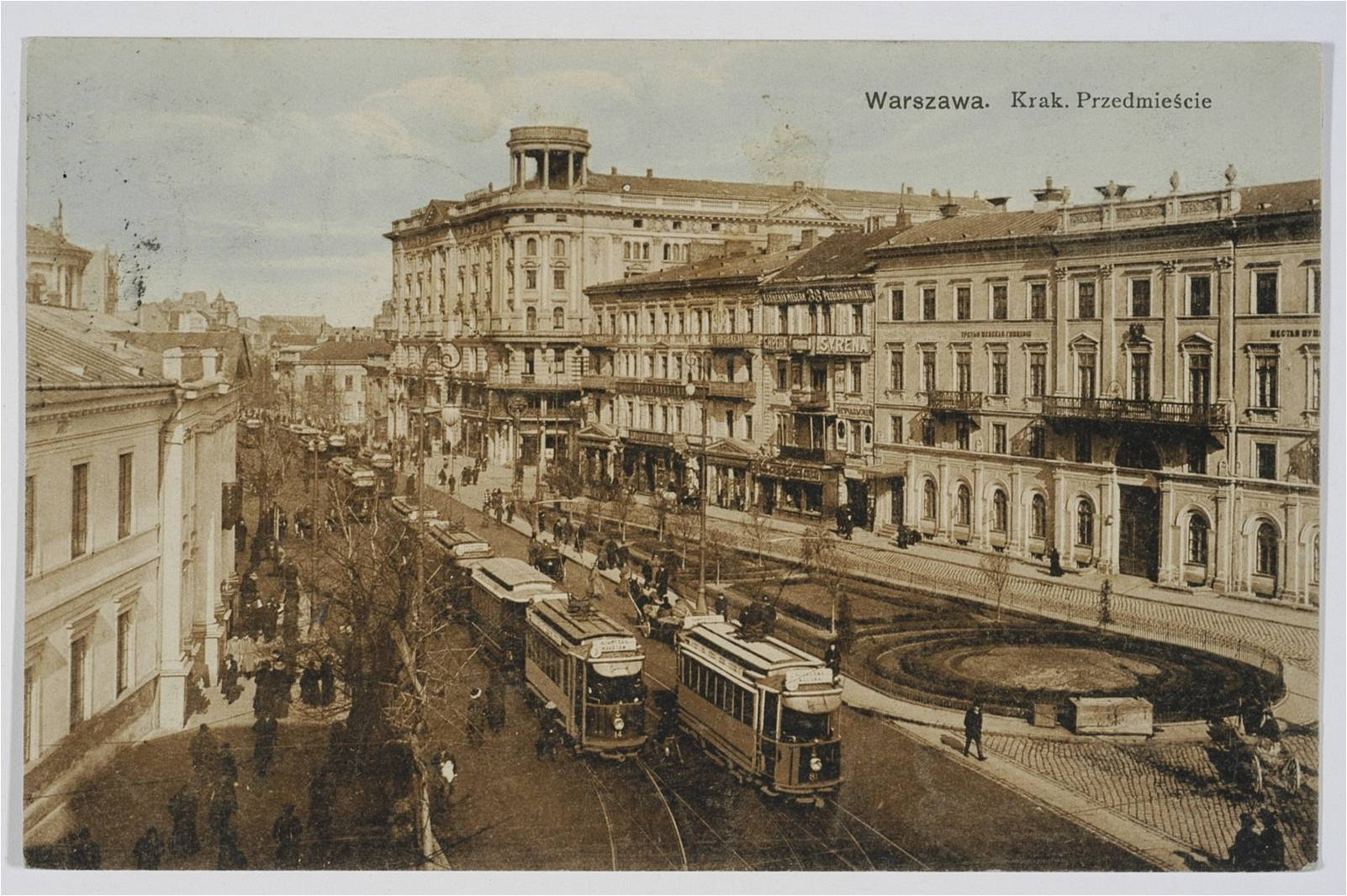
A historic image of Hotel Bristol in Warsaw, 1910

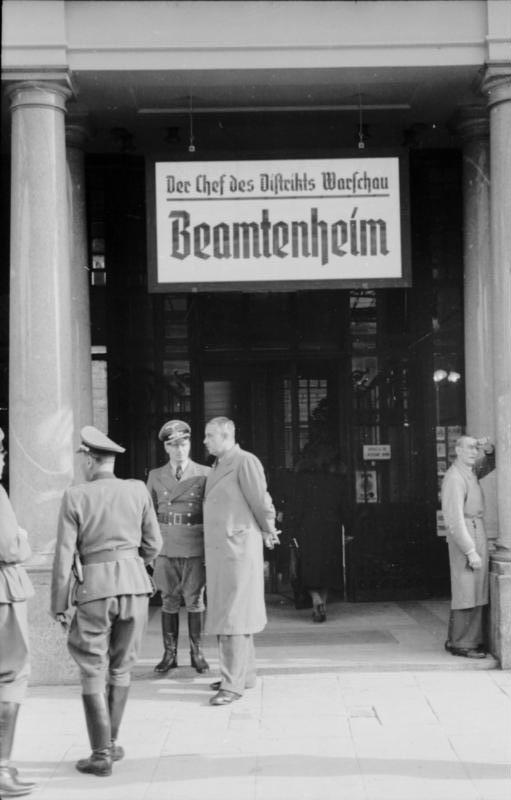
Entrance to the hotel during the German occupation, 1941

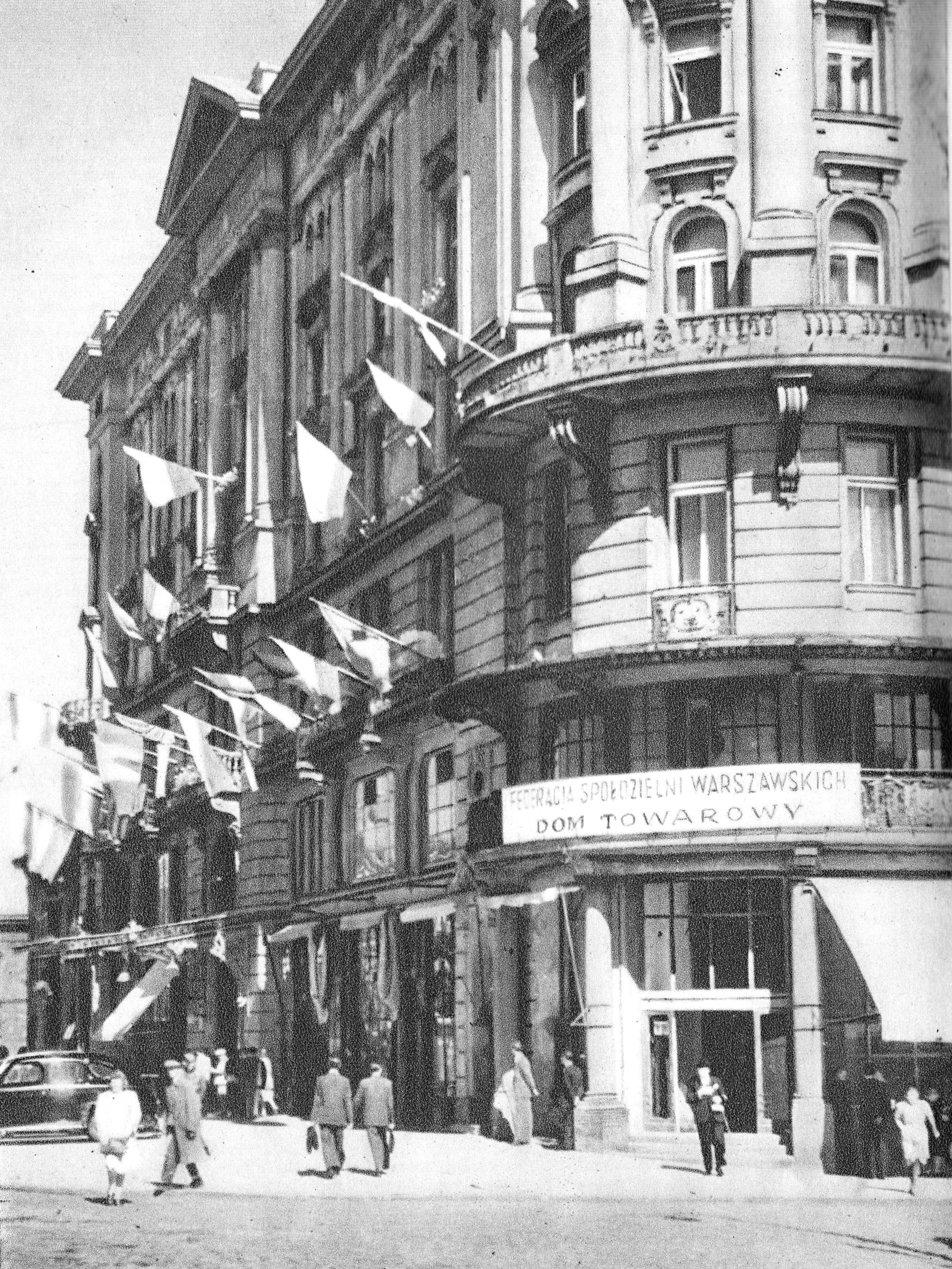
Entrance to the hotel, 1950

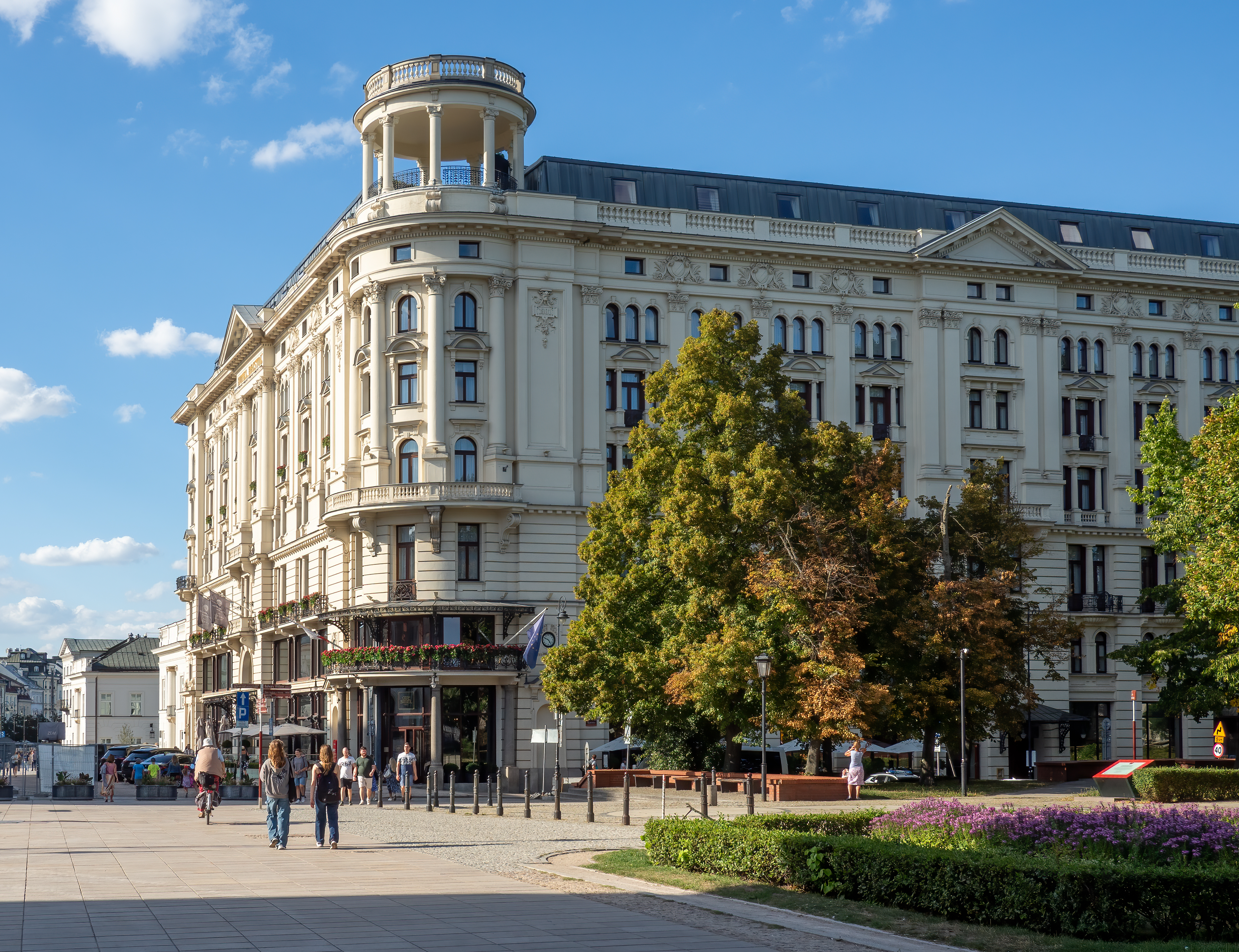
Hotel Bristol on the corner of Karowa Street and Krakowskie Przedmieście

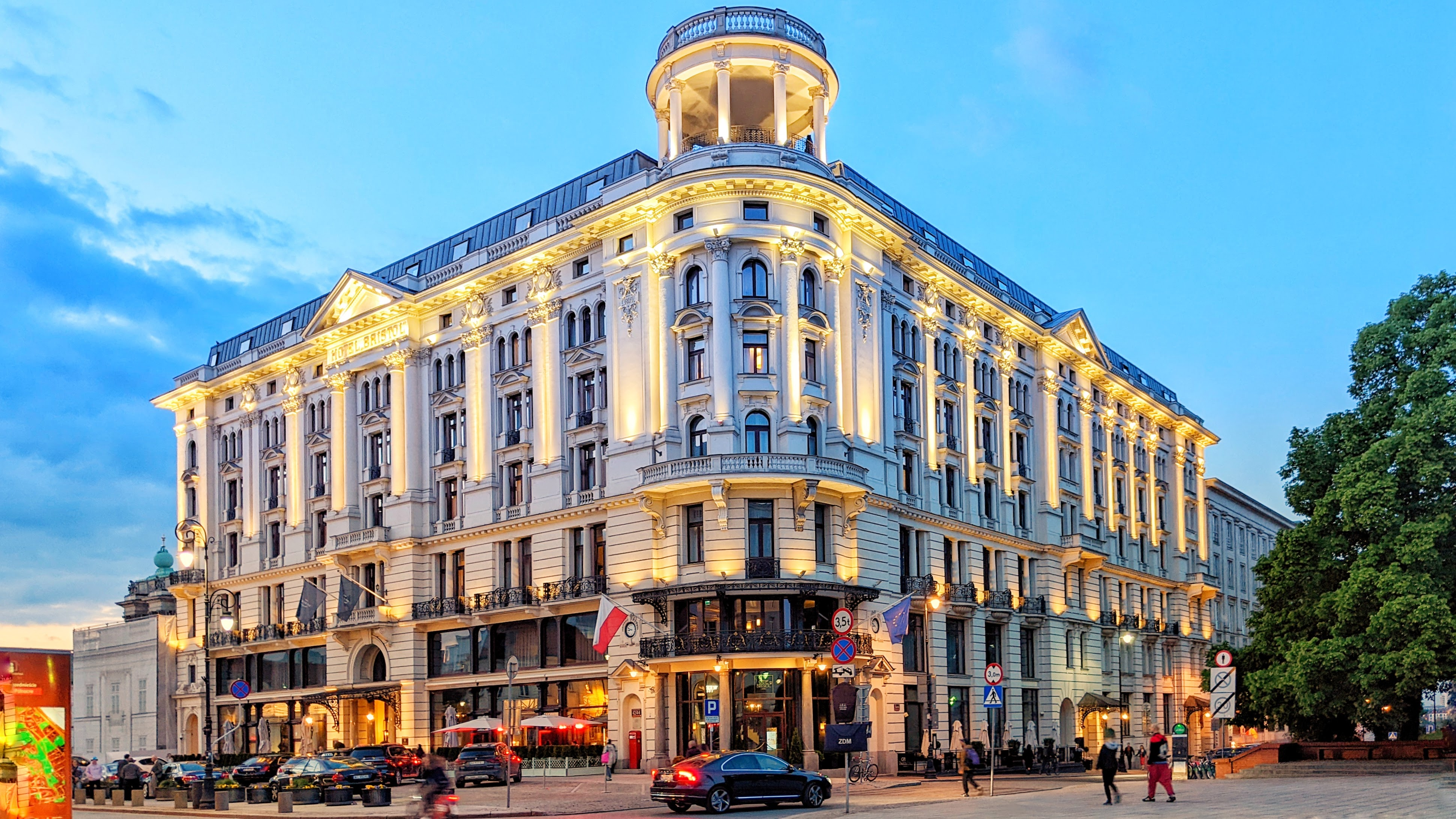
Illumination of the hotel

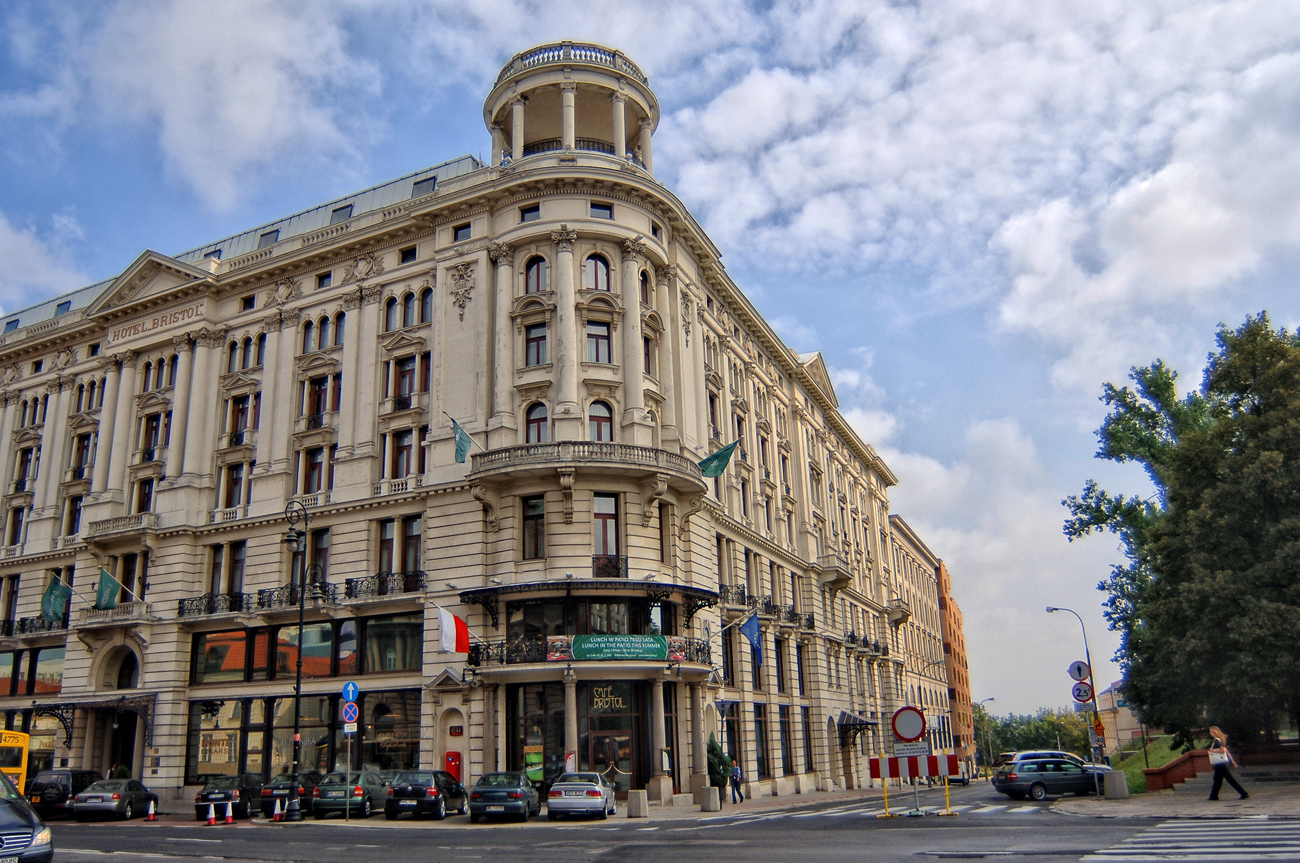
Hotel Bristol in 2006 before renovation

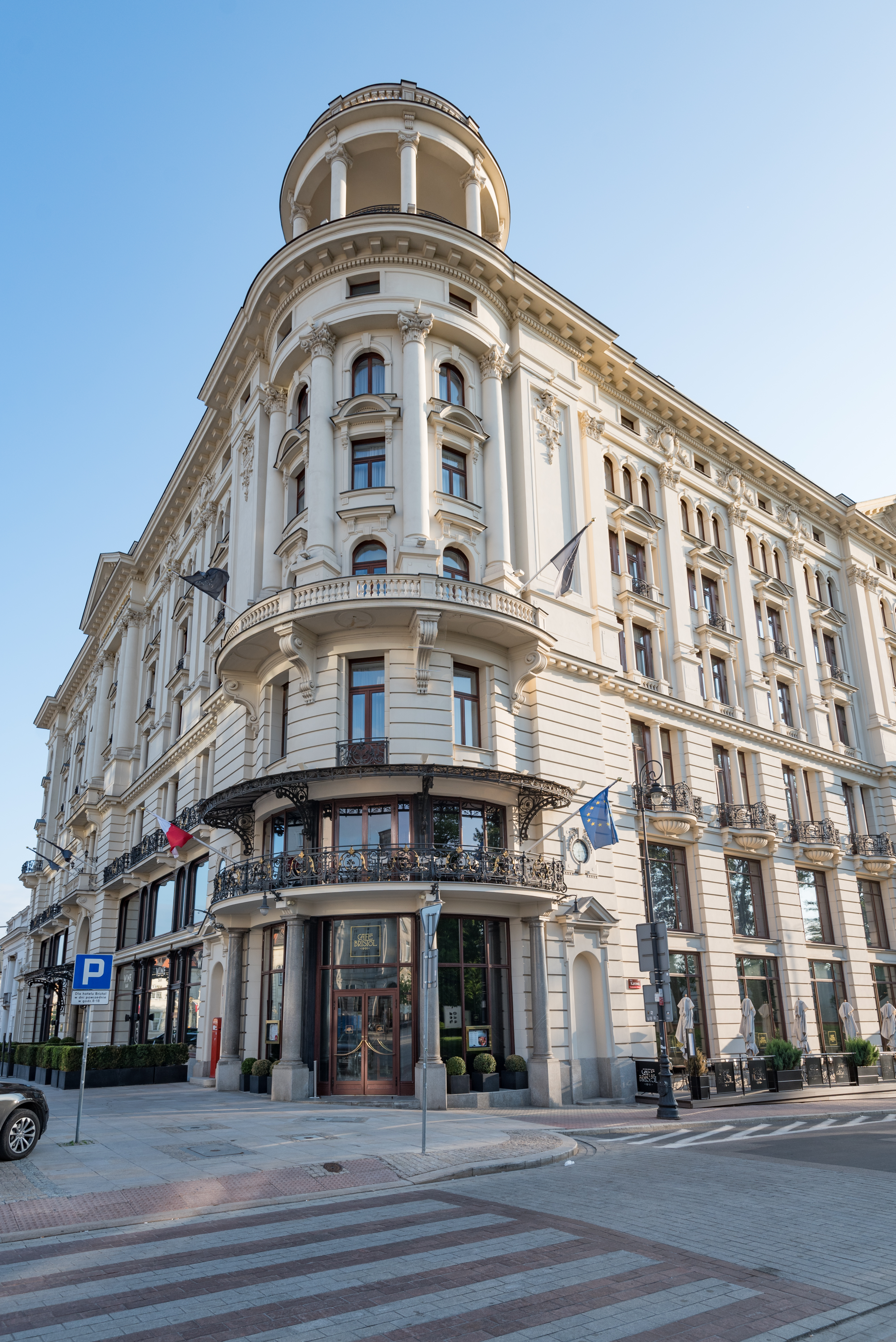
Main entrance

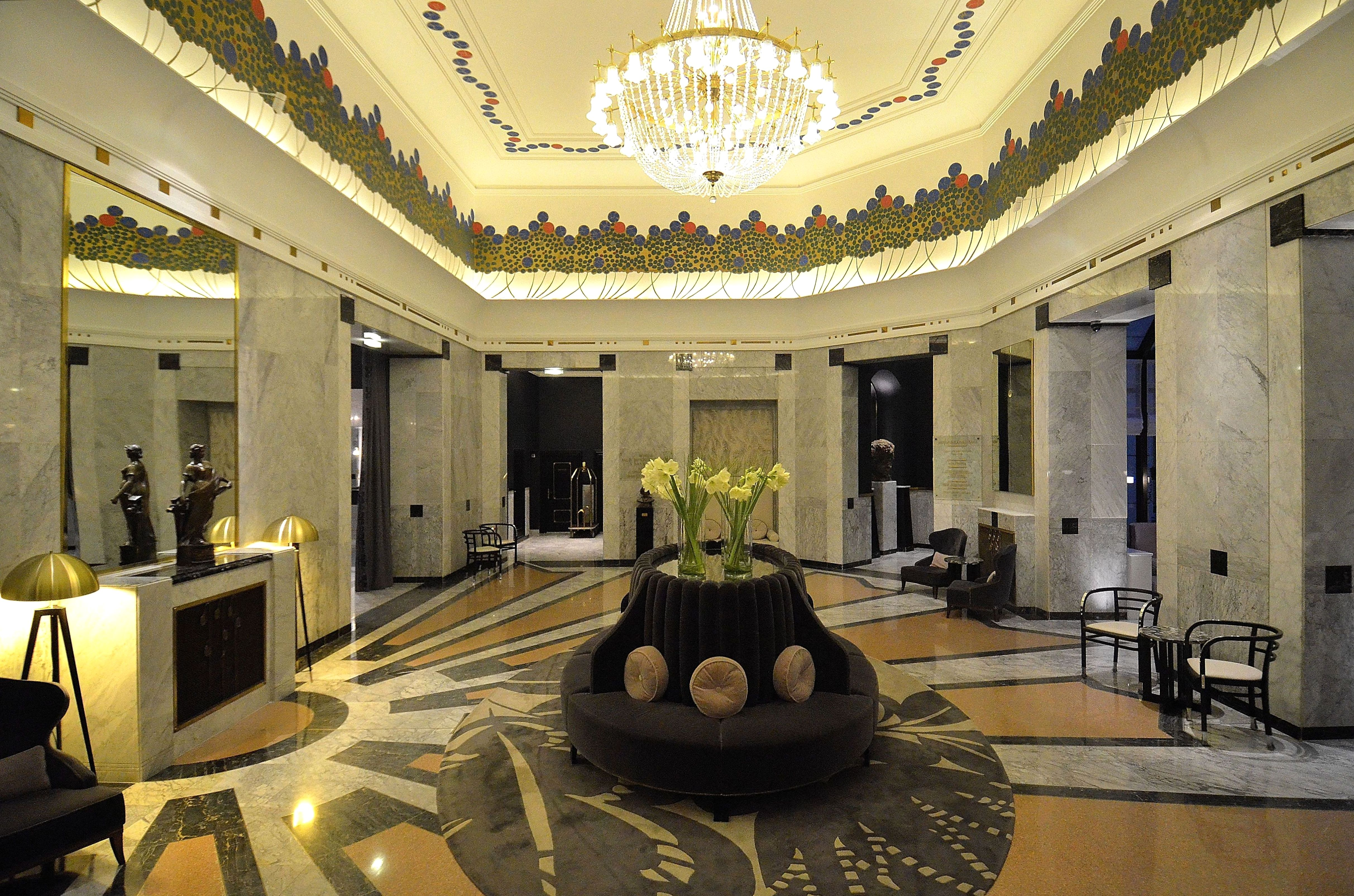
Hotel lobby

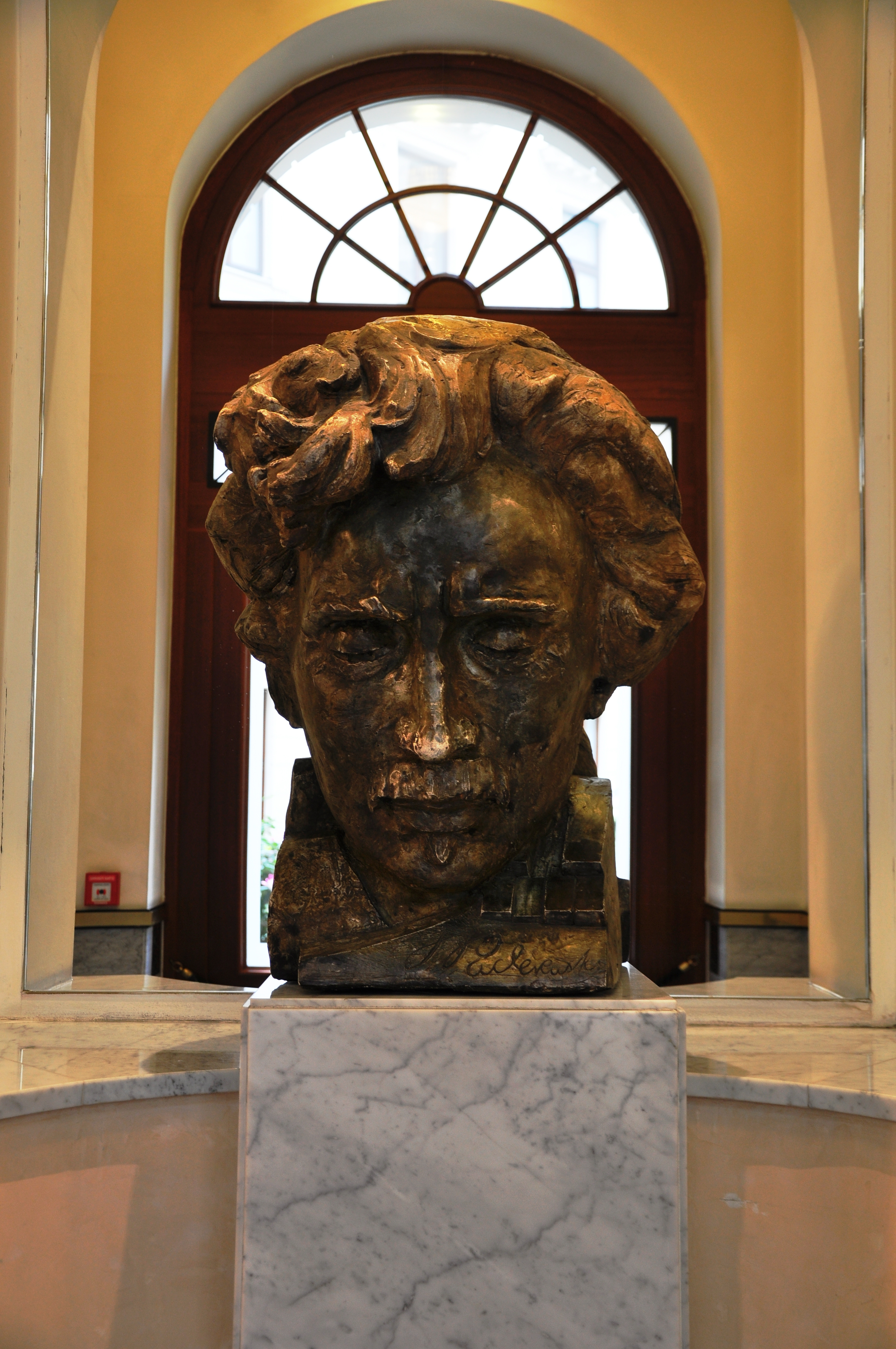
A bust of Ignacy Paderewski

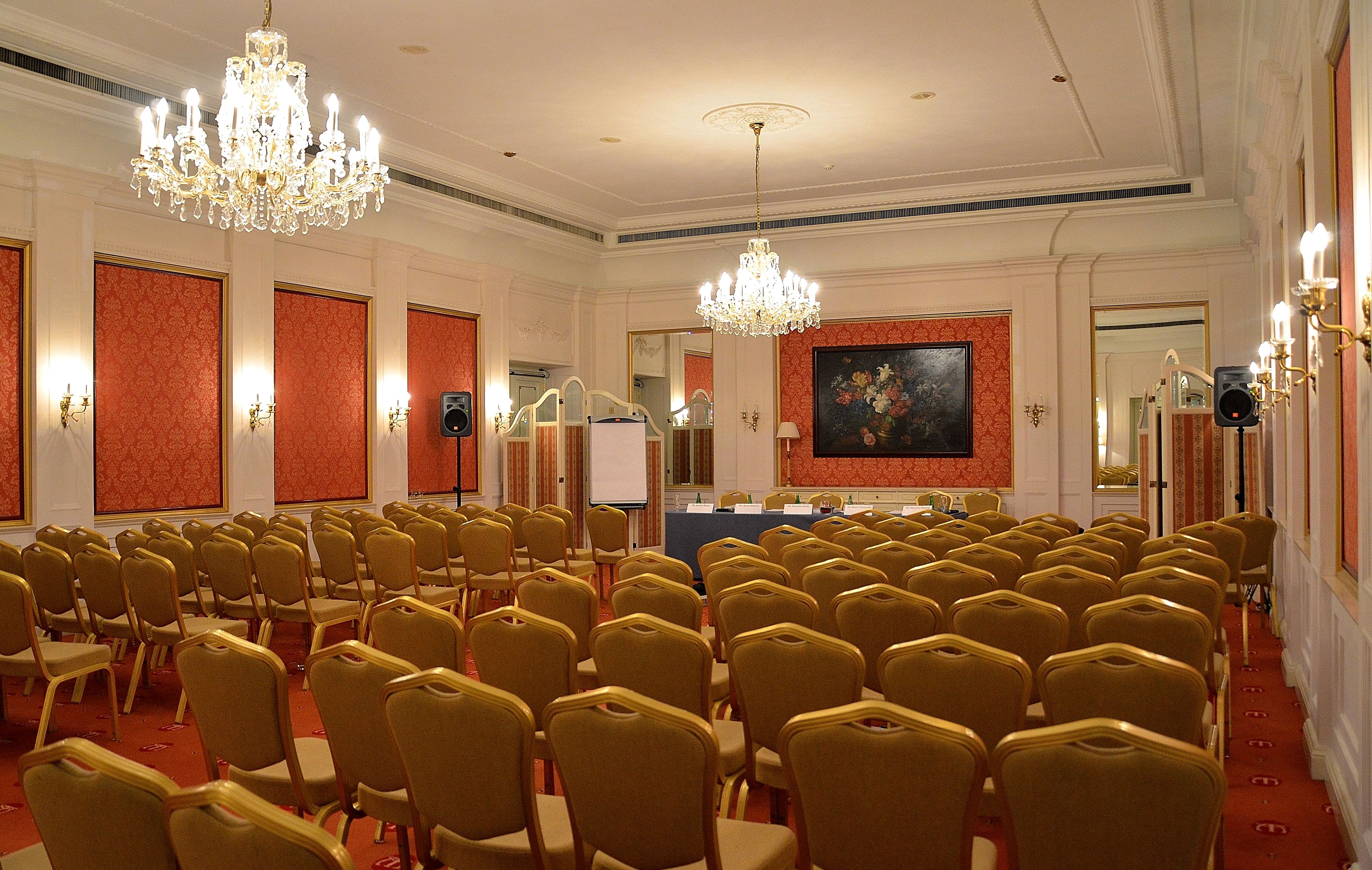
The Malinowa Hall

== See also ==
- Hotel Bristol
- History of Warsaw
- Tourism in Poland
