= Coat of arms of Bristol =

Heraldic symbol of Bristol

- Armiger: Bristol
- Adopted: 1569
- Crest: On a Wreath Or and Gules issuant from Clouds two Arms embowed and interlaced in saltire proper the dexter hand holding a Serpent Vert and the sinister holding a Pair of Scales Or
- Shield: Gules on the sinister side a Castle with two towers domed all argent on each dome a Banner charged with the Cross of St. George the Castle on a Mount Vert the dexter base Water proper thereon a Ship of three masts Or the rigging Sable sailing from a port in the dexter tower her fore and main masts being visible and on each a round top of the fifth on the foremast a sail set and on the mainmast a sail furled of the second
- Supporters: On either side a Unicorn sejant Or armed maned and unguled Sable

The coat of arms of Bristol consists of a sailing boat on water emerging from a castle standing upon grass on the left. The supporters are two unicorns, both sejant, and the crest consists of two arms, one holding a snake and the other a balance. Adopted in 1569, the arms was not the first heraldic symbol the city used; numerous seals were used previously. The city was also granted a heraldic badge in 1983, although less frequently used than the coat of arms.

== Design ==
=== Blazon ===
The blazon of the arms goes as follows:

Arms: Gules on the sinister side a Castle with two towers domed all argent on each dome a Banner charged with the Cross of St. George the Castle on a Mount Vert the dexter base Water proper thereon a Ship of three masts Or the rigging Sable sailing from a port in the dexter tower her fore and main masts being visible and on each a round top of the fifth on the foremast a sail set and on the mainmast a sail furled of the second.

Crest: On a Wreath Or and Gules issuant from Clouds two Arms embowed and interlaced in saltire proper the dexter hand holding a Serpent Vert and the sinister holding a Pair of Scales Or.

Supporters: On either side a Unicorn sejant Or armed maned and unguled Sable.

=== Symbolism ===
The background of the arms is red and shows a ship on blue waves sailing out of a castle which is on grass, symbolising the importance of Bristol as a port. The unicorns serving as supporters represent courage and strength. The crest is composed of a red helm and two crossed arms holding a balance — a common symbol of justice — and a snake evoking wisdom. The motto ''Virtute et Industria'' translates to ''By virtue and industry'' in English.

== History ==
The first known seal used by the City of Bristol was issued early in the reign of King Edward I around 1300. The city was given an unofficial seal featuring a sailing boat coming out of a city gate. On the sailing boat was a man rowing and a second individual pointing the latter in the city gates. Around the seal was the words ''Secreti clavis sum portus. Navita navis Portam custodit. Portum vigil indice prodit'', translating to ''I am the key to the secret harbor. The sailor of the ship guards the gate. The port watchman reveals the secret'' in English. The seal was used on official documents. A second seal was issued by the city and featured the same boat leaving a castle. Around the seal was written ''Sigillum Maioritatis Ville Bristolie'', meaning ''Seal of the Majority of the City of Bristol'' in Latin. The seals was used for over 200 years, until 20 August 1569, when frustration came from the city fathers since the city did not have a suitable civic banner to fly on official occasions for the annual muster of the city "trained bands", the city militia. They went to London to make an application to Robert Cooke, the official bearing the grand title of Clarencieux king-of-arms one of the senior officers with the right to grant heraldic bearings for £7 . He would accept the application and the arms were granted that same year, in 1569. For £4, the city also requested Giles Unyt to engrave a new seal for the coat of arms. Unicorns, the supporters of the coat of arms, have since become the symbol of the city, and the arms can be seen from bridges to the city-hall.

== Heraldic badge ==
Unlike the frequently used coat of arms, the city rarely uses the heraldic badge granted to them by the College of Arms on 16 February 1983. Their blazon goes as follows:

On a Roundel Gules on the sinister side a Castle with two towers domed Argent on each dome a Banner charged with a Cross of St. George issuant from a port in the dexter tower thereof a Ship of three masts Or the fore and mainmasts being visible the rigging and round tops Sable on the foremast a Sail set and on the mainmast a Sail furled both Argent the whole encompassed by a Rope and issuant therefrom four Fleurs-de-Lys Or.

The badge is inspired by the arms; with the sailing boat emerging from a castle. A rope encircles the badge evokes the maritime industry of Bristol and the four fleur-de-lys stylized like a compass represents exploration.
