= Le Bristol Hotel Beirut =

Hotel in Beirut, Lebanon

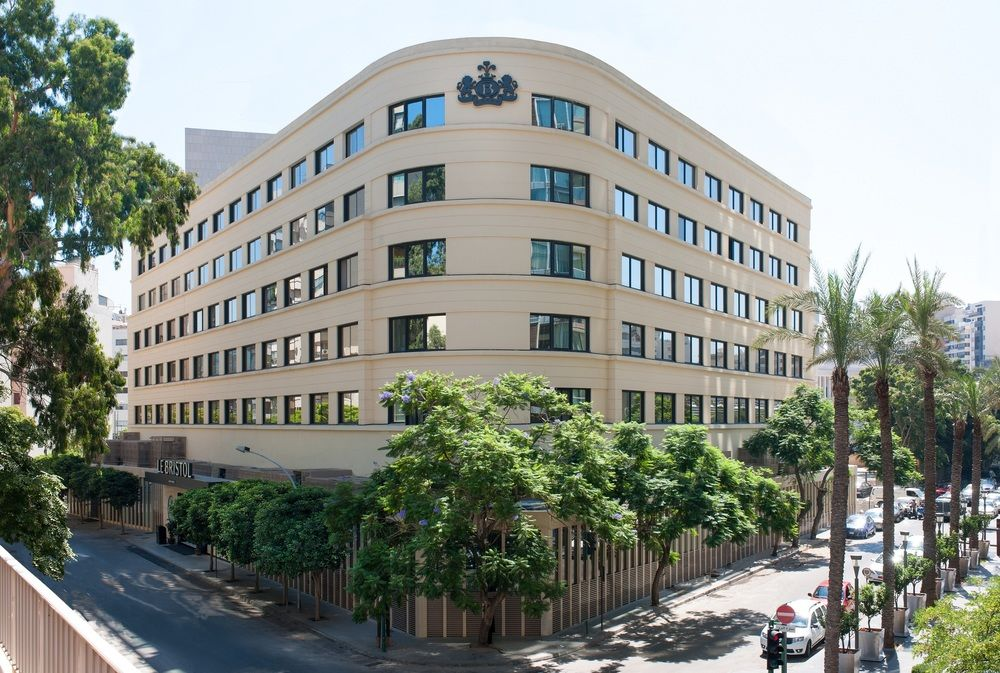

General information
- Location: Beirut, Lebanon
- Opening: 1951
- Closed: 2020

Design and construction
- Architect: Jean Royère

Other information
- Number of rooms: 157
- Number of restaurants: 3

Website
- Official hotel website

The Le Bristol Hotel Beirut was a famous 5-star luxury hotel located in the Verdun neighborhood of Beirut, Lebanon. It opened in 1951 and was famous for both its architecture and guests it hosted. The hotel closed permanently in 2020.

== History ==
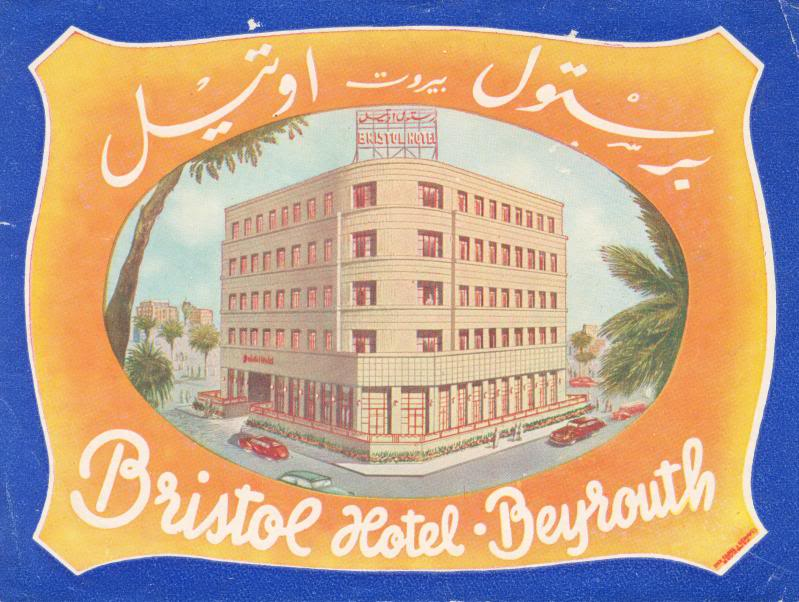
Postcard of Le Bristol in 1958

Hotel Le Bristol first received guests in 1951. The hotel’s first General Manager, Georges al-Rayess, was known for his contribution to the culinary arts and wrote a series of cookbooks that contributed to make the hotel famous for its cuisine. Le Bristol hosted the first ice skating rink in Lebanon, and the Arab world, which was later converted into a political meeting area in the seventies. During the 15 years Lebanese Civil War, Le Bristol managed to keep its doors opened despite the fights that took place in the capital. In 1999, Le Bristol briefly joined The Luxury Collection. In 2013, the hotel underwent a major renovation to refresh the building's exterior and interior. In June 2015, when the renovation was complete, Le Bristol held a ceremony named "Le Bal de Beyrouth" attended by major figures in Lebanon and in the Middle East.

The hotel closed temporarily on March 16, 2020, due to the COVID-19 pandemic. On April 18, 2020, it was announced that the hotel's closure was permanent, due to the combined impact of the Lebanese economic crisis and the pandemic.

== Famous Guests ==
Since its opening, the hotel has hosted famous guests like Albert II, Prince of Monaco, Mohammad Reza Pahlavi, the former Shah of Iran and Soraya Esfandiary-Bakhtiari, Jacques Chirac, former president of France, Abdullah bin Abdulaziz Al Saud, former King of Saudi Arabia, King Hussein of Jordan and Princess Dina bint 'Abdu'l-Hamid of Jordan. It is also inside Le Bristol's walls that politicians from all Lebanese parties frequently hold meetings.

== Architecture ==
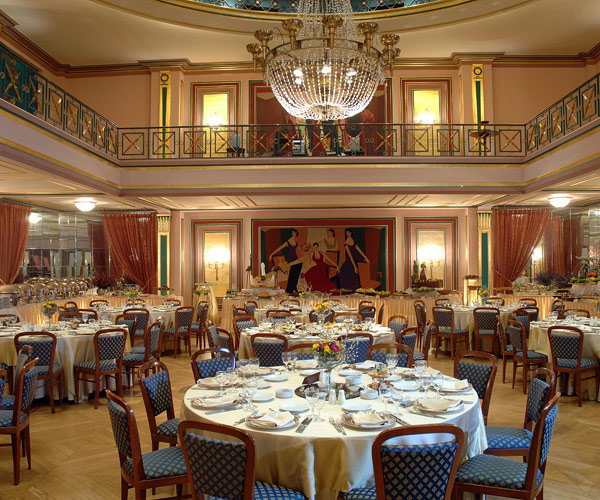
The Golden Room architecture

The hotel consists of a triangular 6-story building that's hollow in the middle to accommodate a garden. The hotel interior was designed by the famous French decorator Jean Royère and was upgraded in 2015 by Galal Mahmoud. The hotel has 157 rooms including suites, a pool, an oriental lounge and restaurants. After the renovation in 2015, the rooms were designed to represent the Lebanese and luxury design history.

=== Oriental Rooms ===
The oriental room has a touch of oriental luxury and colours mixed with the design of the 21st century.

=== 1960s Rooms ===
The 1960s rooms uses colors and modernized 1960s furniture.

=== Modern Rooms ===
The modern classical room represents the 21st century design and has modern furniture.

=== The Oriental Lounge ===
Near the hotel's lobby is the Oriental Lounge which features an architecture specific to the orient that was crafted by hand by Lebanese artisans in the 1950s. After the renovation, the original work was kept and mixed with colorful furniture.

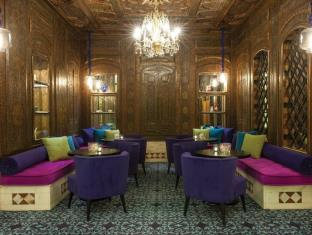
The oriental lounge at Le Bristol Hotel in Beirut

== Culinary ==
Le Bristol is recognised for its cuisine and pastries. Les Gourmandises which was affiliated to the hotel served sweets and pastries. The hotel itself provided high-end catering services.
