= Hotel Bristol (Berlin) =

Hotel in Berlin, Germany

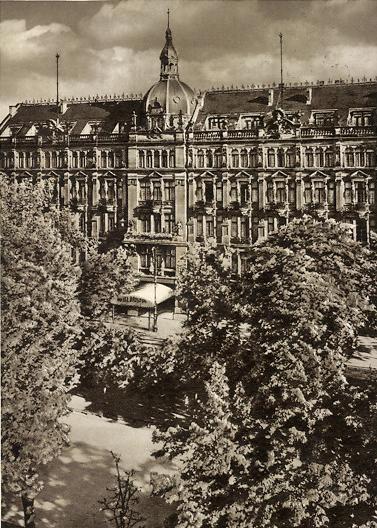
- Hotel Bristol around 1910
- Interactive map of the Hotel Bristol area

General information
- Location: Berlin, Germany
- Opening: 1891
- Closed: 1943

Design and construction
- Architect: Gustav Georg Carl Gause

Hotel Bristol was a luxury hotel on Unter den Linden in Berlin, Germany. It was designed by architect Gustav Georg Carl Gause and opened in 1891.

== History ==
The Hotel Bristol was built in an era of economic boom and ever increasing travel and business. It was constructed between 1890 and 1891. It was designed by architect Gustav Georg Carl Gause for owner Conrad Uhl. The hotel opened fifteen years after the opening of the then leading luxury Kaiserhof Hotel. It also competed with the nearby Central-Hotel that opened 1881. The hotel initially had the address Unter den Linden 5–6, but after the numbering of the buildings on the street changed in 1936/37, it became Number 65.

In 1904, following the hotel's bankruptcy, the Hotelbetriebs-Aktiengesellschaft (now Kempinski) acquired the hotel. The company paid over 10 million marks for the property, it also took over the nearby Behrenstraße property for 1.2 million marks.

The hotel restaurant was frequented by French Embassy staff until the July Crisis starting World War I in 1914, when the German government ordered French Ambassador Jules Cambon against dining there to ensure their safety until they could be evacuated.

On February 15, 1944, an Allied air raid on Berlin destroyed the Hotel Bristol. After the War, the Soviet Union built its embassy in East Berlin on the site of the former hotel.

The Hotel Bristol was one of the most distinguished luxury hotels in Berlin. In 1904 it had 350 rooms and a garden. A hotel expert described it in a travel guide published in 1905 as the "most international" of Berlin hotels. Later, the total number of living rooms, salons, bedrooms, and bathrooms, was 515. The hotel's bar was popular with wealthy young naval officers during World War I.

== Events ==
On September 30, 1897, the first International Motor Show Germany was held at the hotel, with a total of eight motor vehicles on display.

== Notable guests ==
- In April 1904 Ferdinand Sauerbruch stayed at the hotel. He later listed it as one of his favorite restaurants and hotels. In the 1930s, Sauerbruch stayed at the hotel when he participated with colleague Johann von Mikulicz in an international conference for surgeons.
- On February 27, 1940, German artist and architect Peter Behrens died of heart failure in the Hotel Bristol.
- Other notable guests have included George Bernard Shaw and Friedrich Alfred Krupp.

== Literature ==
Novelist Vicki Baum worked at the hotel as a chambermaid in order to get experience and inspiration to write Grand Hotel, her most well-known work.

Hotel Bristol is one of the locations in Theodor Fontane's novel, Der Stechlin. Fontane's aging aristocrat Stechlin stays in the hotel and wonders why so many first-class hotels are called Bristol. "Bristol is at the end only a place of the second rank, but Hotel Bristol is always fine", he says.
