= Avro Lancaster =

World War II British heavy bomber aircraft

Lancaster
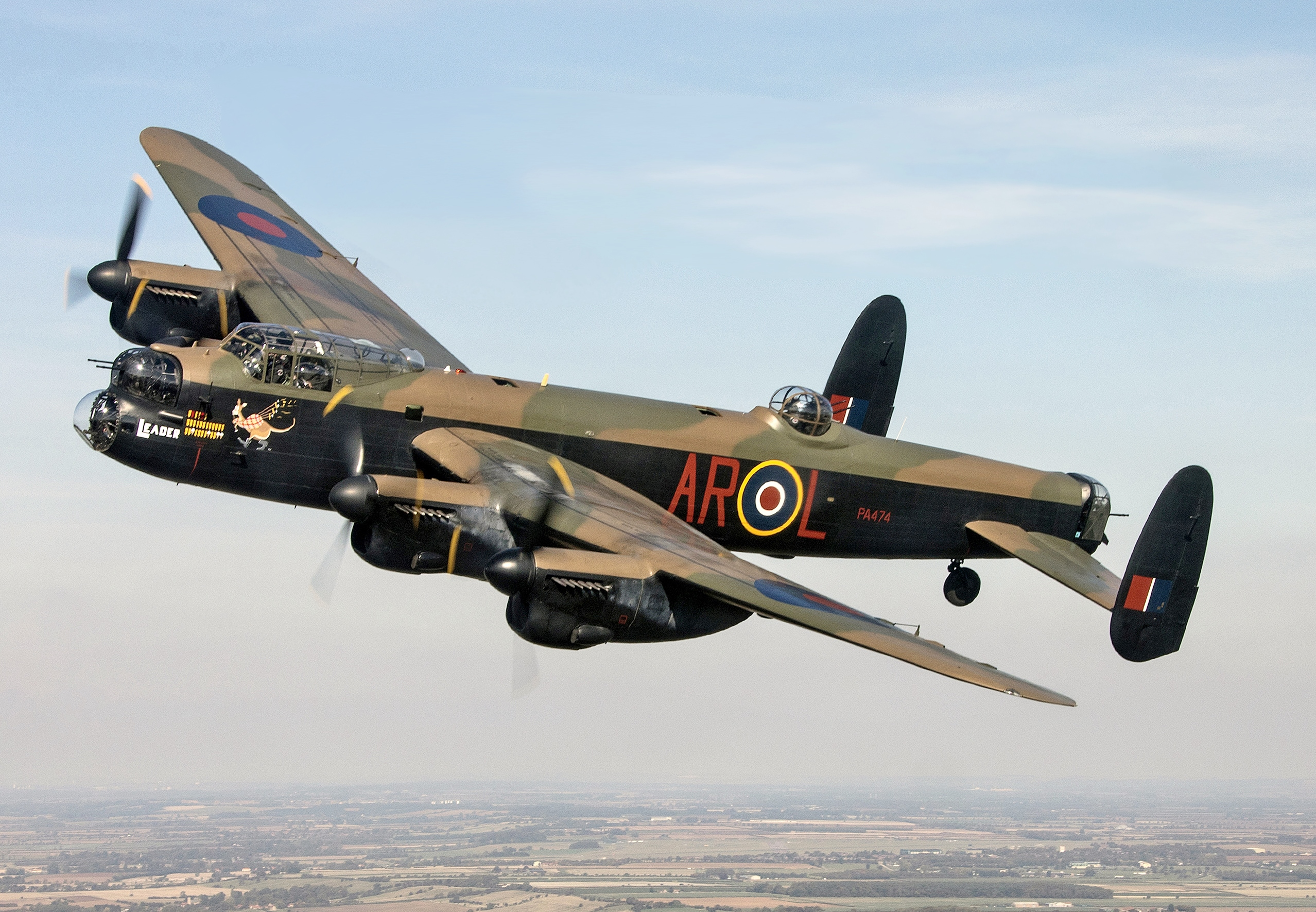
- Lancaster B.I PA474 (Note: This aircraft carries the deepened bomb aimer blister (Mod. 780) and the later paddle-bladed propellers. Neither H2S blister nor exhaust shrouds are fitted.) of the RAF Battle of Britain Memorial Flight in 460 Squadron (RAAF) colours

General information
- Type: Heavy bomber
- National origin: United Kingdom
- Manufacturer: Avro
- Designer: Roy Chadwick
- Built by: Avro and five others (in UK & Canada)
- Primary users: Royal Air Force Royal Canadian Air Force; Royal Australian Air Force
- Number built: 7,377

History
- Introduction date: February 1942
- First flight: 9 January 1941
- Retired: 1 April 1964 Royal Canadian Air Force
- Developed from: Avro Manchester
- Variant: Avro Lancastrian
- Developed into: Avro York; Avro Lincoln

The Avro Lancaster, commonly known as the Lancaster Bomber, is a British World War II heavy bomber. It was designed and manufactured by Avro as a contemporary of the Handley Page Halifax, both bombers having been developed to the same specification, as well as the Short Stirling, all three aircraft being four-engine heavy bombers adopted by the Royal Air Force (RAF) during the same era.

The Lancaster has its origins in the twin-engine Avro Manchester, which had been developed during the late 1930s in response to the Air Ministry Specification P.13/36 for a medium bomber for "world-wide use" to carry a torpedo internally and make shallow dive-bombing attacks. Originally developed as an evolution of the Manchester, which had proved troublesome in service and was retired in 1942, the Lancaster was designed by Roy Chadwick and powered by four Rolls-Royce Merlin engines and in one of the versions, Bristol Hercules engines. It first saw service with RAF Bomber Command in 1942 and as the strategic bombing offensive over Europe gathered momentum, it was the main aircraft for the night-time bombing campaigns that followed. As increasing numbers of the type were produced, it became the principal heavy bomber used by the RAF, the Royal Canadian Air Force (RCAF) and squadrons from other Commonwealth and European countries serving within the RAF, overshadowing the Halifax and Stirling, two other commonly-used bombers.

A long, unobstructed bomb bay meant that the Lancaster could take the largest bombs used by the RAF, including the 4,000 lb (1,800 kg), 8,000 lb (3,600 kg) and 12,000 lb (5,400 kg) "blockbusters", loads often supplemented with smaller bombs or incendiaries. The "Lanc", as it was known colloquially, became one of the most heavily used of the Second World War night bombers, delivering 608,612 long tons (618,378,000 kg) of bombs in 156,000 sorties. The versatility of the Lancaster was such that it was chosen to equip 617 Squadron and was modified to carry the Upkeep "bouncing bomb" designed by Barnes Wallis for Operation Chastise, the attack on German Ruhr Valley dams. Although the Lancaster was primarily a night bomber, it excelled in many other roles, including daylight precision bombing, for which some Lancasters were adapted to carry the 12,000 lb (5,400 kg) Tallboy and then the 22,000 lb (10,000 kg) Grand Slam earthquake bombs (also designed by Wallis). This was the largest payload of any bomber in the war.

In 1943, a Lancaster was converted to become an engine test bed for the Metropolitan-Vickers F.2 turbojet. Lancasters were later used to test other engines, including the Armstrong Siddeley Mamba and Rolls-Royce Dart turboprops and the Avro Canada Orenda and STAL Dovern turbojets. Postwar, the Lancaster was supplanted as the main strategic bomber of the RAF by the Avro Lincoln, a larger version of the Lancaster. The Lancaster took on the role of long range anti-submarine patrol aircraft (later supplanted by the Avro Shackleton) and air-sea rescue. It was also used for photo-reconnaissance and aerial mapping, as a flying tanker for aerial refuelling and as the Avro Lancastrian, a long-range, high-speed, transatlantic passenger and postal delivery airliner. In March 1946, a Lancastrian of BSAA flew the first scheduled flight from the new London Heathrow Airport.

== Development ==
=== Origins ===
In the 1930s, the Royal Air Force (RAF) was primarily interested in twin-engine bombers. These designs put limited demands on engine production and maintenance, both of which were already stretched with the introduction of so many new types into service. Power limitations were so serious that the British invested heavily in the development of huge engines in the 2,000 hp (1,500 kW) class to improve performance. During the late 1930s, none of these were ready for production. Both the United States and the Soviet Union were pursuing the development of bombers powered by arrangements of four smaller engines; the results of these projects proved to possess favourable characteristics such as excellent range and fair lifting capacity. Accordingly, in 1936, the RAF also decided to investigate the feasibility of the four-engined bomber.

The origins of the Lancaster stem from a twin-engined bomber that had been submitted to British Air Ministry Specification P.13/36 of 1936 for a twin-engined medium bomber for "worldwide use" which could carry a torpedo internally, and make shallow dive-bombing attacks. Further requirements of the specification included the use of a mid-mounted cantilever monoplane wing, and all-metal construction while the use of the Rolls-Royce Vulture, which was in development was encouraged. Twin-engine designs were submitted by Fairey, Boulton Paul, Handley Page and Shorts, using Rolls-Royce Vulture, Napier Sabre, Fairey P.24 or Bristol Hercules engines. Most of these engines were still under development and while four-engined bomber designs were considered for specification B.12/36 for a heavy bomber, the extra engines required the wing and overall aircraft structure to be stronger, increasing the structural weight.

Avro submitted the Avro 679 to fulfil Specification P.13/36 and, in February 1937, Avro's submission was selected, along with Handley Page's bid as a backup. In April 1937, a pair of prototypes for each design was ordered. Avro's aircraft, named the Manchester, entered RAF service in November 1940. Although a capable aircraft, the Manchester was underpowered and its Vulture engines proved to be unreliable. As a result, only 200 were constructed and the type was withdrawn from service in 1942.

=== Flight testing ===
By mid-1940, Avro's chief design engineer, Roy Chadwick, was working on an improved Manchester powered by four of the more reliable but less powerful Rolls-Royce Merlin engines, specifically adopting the "Power-egg" installation developed for the Beaufighter II, and installed on a wing of increased span. Initially, the improved aircraft was designated as the Type 683 Manchester III but was subsequently renamed the Lancaster. The prototype, serial number BT308, was assembled by the Avro experimental flight department at Ringway Airport, Manchester, being modified from a production Manchester airframe, combined with the new wing to accommodate the additional engines. The first flight was made by test pilot H. A. "Sam" Brown on 9 January 1941 at RAF Ringway, Cheshire.

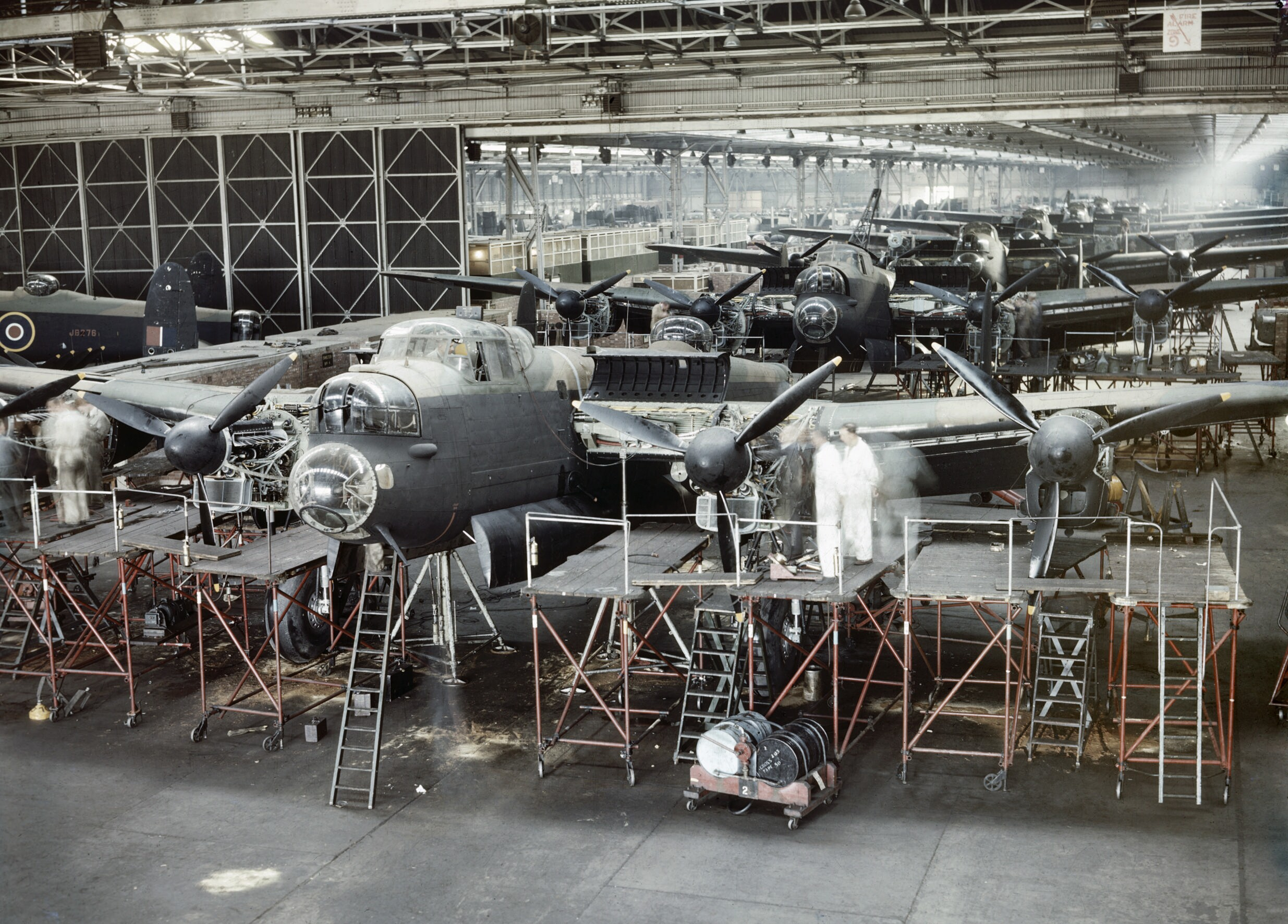
Lancasters on Avro's Woodford assembly line at Cheshire, 1943

Flight testing of the new aircraft quickly proved it to be a substantial improvement over its predecessor. The first prototype was initially outfitted with the Manchester I's three-finned tail but this was revised on the second prototype, DG595, and subsequent production Lancasters used the larger elliptical twin-finned tail unit that was also adopted for the last Manchesters built. This not only increased stability but also improved the dorsal gun turret's field of fire. The second prototype was also fitted with more powerful Merlin XX engines.

Manchesters still on the production line were converted into Lancaster B.Is. Based upon its performance, a decision was taken early on to reequip twin-engine bomber squadrons with the Lancaster as quickly as possible. L7527, The first production Lancaster made its first flight in October 1941, powered by Merlin XX engines.

=== Production ===
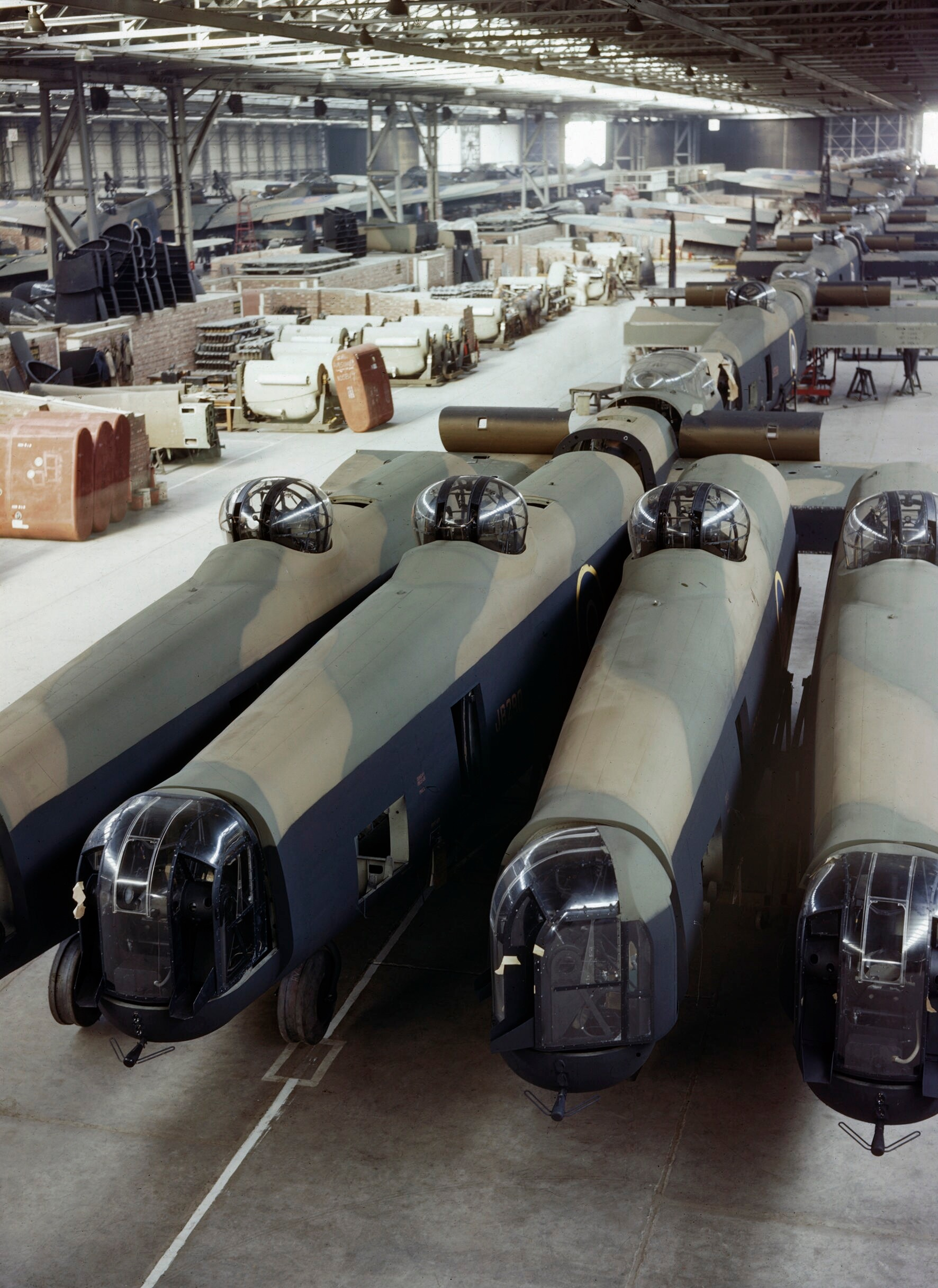
Lancasters under construction at Avro's factory at Woodford, Cheshire, 1943

Avro received an initial contract for 1,070 Lancasters. The majority of Lancasters manufactured during the war years were constructed by Avro at its factory at Chadderton near Oldham, Lancashire and were test-flown from Woodford Aerodrome in Cheshire. As it was quickly recognised that Avro's capacity was exceeded by the wartime demand for the type, it was decided to form the Lancaster Aircraft Group, which comprised a number of companies that undertook the type's manufacture, either performing primary assembly themselves or producing various subsections and components for the other participating manufacturers. Wythenshawe Bus Garage, built of reinforced concrete during 1939–42 and designed by the Manchester City Architect, G. Noel Hill, was immediately taken over by the Ministry of Aircraft Production and Avro used it in its Lancaster aircraft production.

In addition to Avro, further Lancasters were constructed by Metropolitan-Vickers (1,080, also tested at Woodford) and Armstrong Whitworth. They were also produced at the Austin Motor Company works in Longbridge, Birmingham, later in the Second World War and post-war by Vickers-Armstrongs at Chester as well as at the Vickers Armstrong factory, Castle Bromwich, Birmingham. Belfast-based aircraft firm Short Brothers had also received an order for 200 Lancaster B.Is, but this was cancelled before any aircraft had been completed.

The Lancaster was also produced overseas. Attempts to set up an Australian line resulted in post war production of the Lincoln. During early 1942, it was decided that the bomber should be produced in Canada, where it was manufactured by Victory Aircraft in Malton, Ontario. Of later variants, only the Canadian-built Lancaster B X was produced in significant numbers. A total of 430 of this type were built, including 8 as transport versions, earlier examples differing little from their British-built predecessors, except for using Packard-built Merlin engines and American-style instruments and electrics. In August 1942, a British-built Lancaster B.I was dispatched to Canada as a pattern aircraft, becoming the first of the type to conduct a transatlantic crossing. The first Lancaster produced in Canada was named the "Ruhr Express". (Note: The "Ruhr Express" the subject of a Canadian National Film Board production Target Berlin for the Canada Carries On series, filmed in part over Berlin by NFB cameraman Grant McLean.) The first batch of Canadian Lancasters delivered to England suffered from faulty ailerons; this error was subsequently traced to the use of unskilled labour. By the end of the conflict, over 10,000 Canadians were employed on the production line, peak production was 50 in March 1945. Most references agree on total mark I plus mark III production but can have minor differences in the breakdown between the two versions.

Production by factory
Manufacturer	Location	I prototype	I	II prototype	II	III	VII	X	Number produced	Period
A. V. Roe	Woodford	2	897	1		2,773			2,978	October 1941 to October 1945
A. V. Roe	Chadderton	2	897	1		2,773			2,978	October 1941 to October 1945
A. V. Roe	Yeadon	2	897	1		2,773			695	October 1941 to October 1945
Armstrong Whitworth	Coventry		917		300	112			1,329	August 1942 to January 1946
Austin Motors	Longbridge	150					180		330	March 1944 to December 1945
Austin Motors	Marston Green	150					180		330	March 1944 to December 1945
Metropolitan-Vickers	Trafford Park		949			131			1,080	January 1942 to August 1945
Vickers-Armstrongs	Castle Bromwich		300						300	November 1943 to August 1945
Vickers-Armstrongs	Chester		235						235	June 1944 to September 1945
Victory Aircraft	Malton (Canada)							430	430	August 1943 to October 1945
Total		2	3,448	1	300	3,016	180	430	7,377	

=== Further development ===
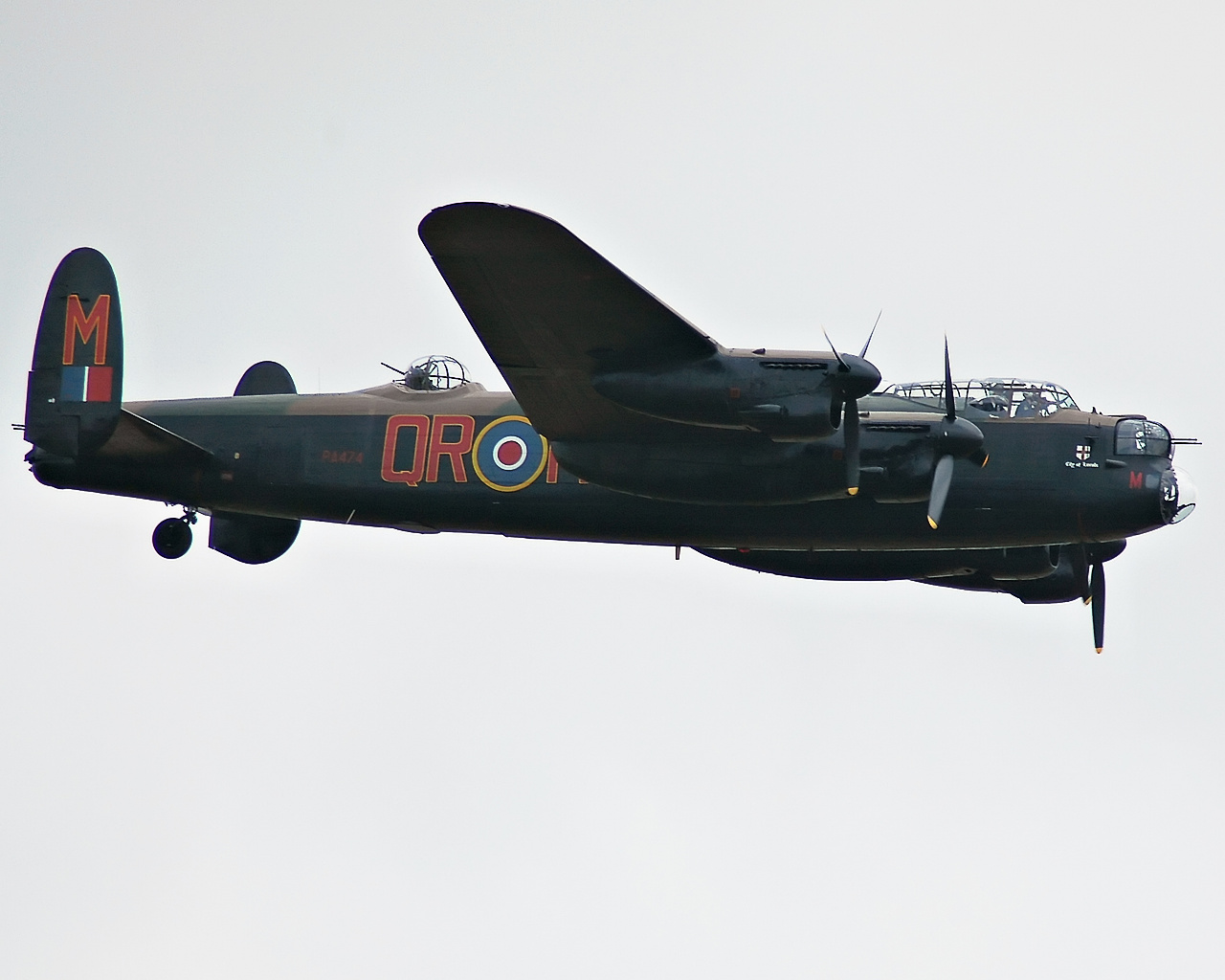
PA474, Lancaster B.I of the RAF Battle of Britain Memorial Flight

The Lancaster B.I was never fully superseded in production by a successor model, remaining in production until February 1946. According to aviation authors Brian Goulding and M. Garbett, the Lancaster B.I altered little during its production life, partially as a result of the sound basic structure and design; of the visible changes, the fuselage side windows were deleted, the Perspex chin of the bomb-aimer was enlarged, and a larger astrodome was provided. Various additional bumps and blisters were also added, which typically housed radar equipment and radio navigational aids. Some Lancaster B.I bombers were outfitted with bulged bomb bay doors to accommodate increased armament payloads.

Early production Lancaster B.Is were outfitted with a ventral gun turret position. In response to feedback on the lack of application for the ventral turret, the ventral turret was often eliminated during the course of each aircraft's career. While some groups chose to discard the position entirely, various trials and experiments were performed at RAF Duxford, Cambridgeshire and by individual squadrons. A total of 50 Austin-built Lancaster B.Is was constructed to a non-standard configuration, having a Frazer Nash turret installed directly above the bomb bay; however, this modification was largely unpopular due to its obstruction of the internal walkway, hindering crew movements. Various other turret configurations were adopted by individual squadrons, which included the removal of various combinations of turrets.

The Lancaster B.III was powered by Packard Merlin engines, which had been built overseas in the United States, but was otherwise identical to contemporary B.Is. In total, 3,030 B.IIIs were constructed, almost all of them at Avro's Newton Heath factory. The Lancaster B.I and B.III were manufactured concurrently and minor modifications were made to both marks as further batches were ordered. The B.I and B.III designations were effectively interchangeable simply by changing the engines used, which was occasionally done in practice. Examples of modifications made include the relocation of the pitot head from the nose to the side of the cockpit and the change from de Havilland "needle blade" propellers to Hamilton Standard or Nash Kelvinator made "paddle blade" propellers.

== Design ==
=== Overview ===
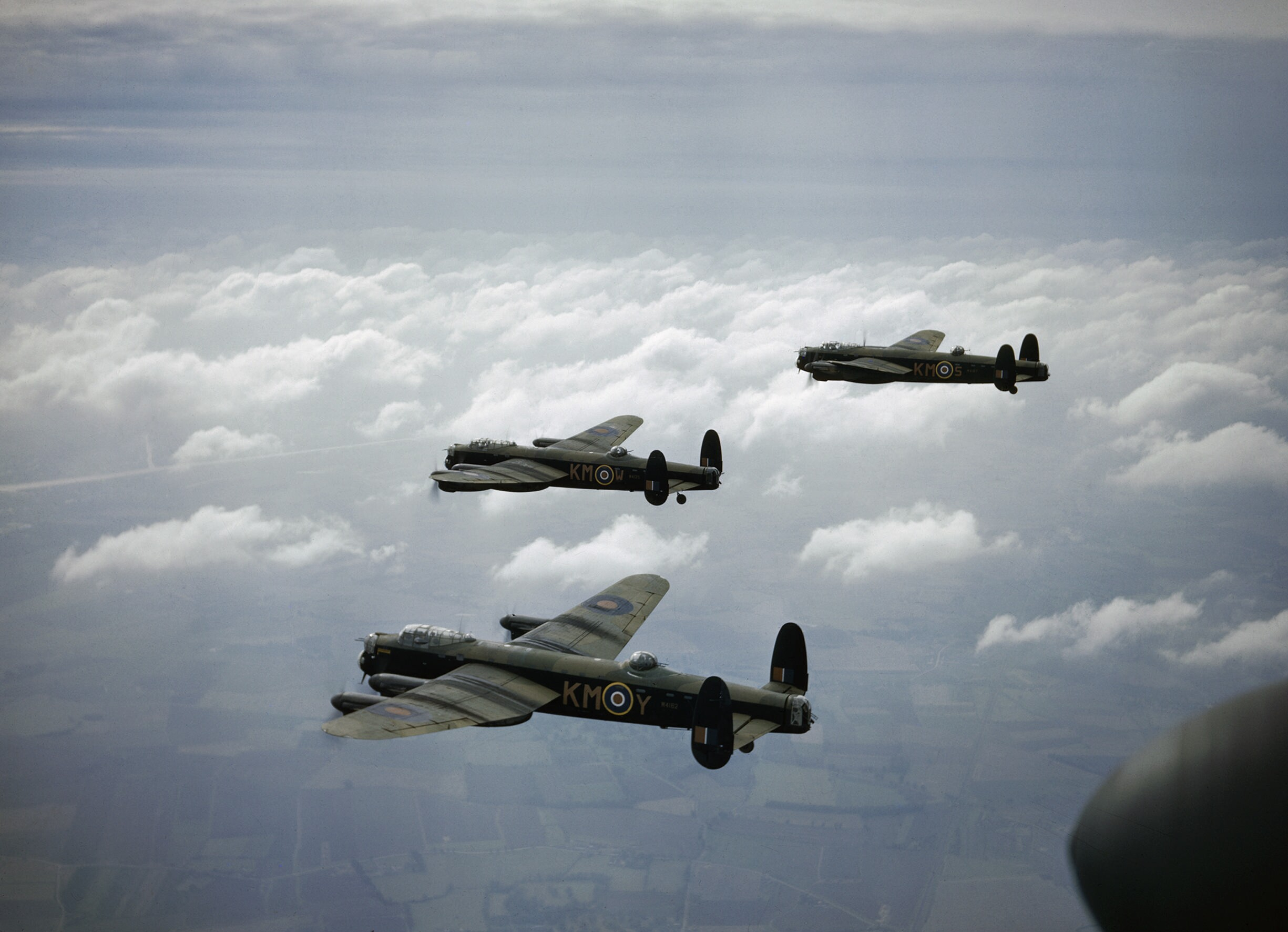
Three 44 Squadron Avro Lancaster B.Is in 1942

The Avro Lancaster was a British four-engined strategic bomber that was used as the RAF's principal heavy bomber during the latter half of the Second World War. The typical aircraft was powered by an arrangement of four wing-mounted Rolls-Royce Merlin piston engines, each of which drove a 13 ft (4.0 m) diameter de Havilland Hydromatic three-bladed propeller. While not optimal, the Lancaster was capable of flying the return journey home on only two operational engines, along with very limited distances on a single running engine. Aviation authors Brian Goulding and M. Garbett have claimed that experienced Lancaster pilots were often able to out-manoeuver Luftwaffe fighters. It possessed largely favourable flying characteristics, having been described by Goulding and Garbett as being: "a near-perfect flying machine, fast for its size and very smooth...such a delightfully easy aeroplane to fly...there are instances of Lancasters having been looped and barrel-rolled, both intentionally and otherwise".

The Lancaster benefited from a structure that possessed considerable strength and durability, which had been intentionally designed to maximise structural strength-per-weight; this resulted in the Lancaster being capable of withstanding some levels of damage resulting from attacks by hostile interceptor aircraft and ground-based anti-aircraft batteries. However, during the first year of the type's career, some instances of structural failures were encountered on Lancaster B.Is and a number of aircraft were lost in accidents as a result of the design limitations having been greatly exceeded.

Video of the Lancaster landing gear retraction and extension, ex-situ.

The Lancaster uses a mid-wing cantilever monoplane configuration. The wing is constructed from five separate main sections while the fuselage is likewise composed of five sections. Aside from a few elements, such as the fabric-covered ailerons, the Lancaster's oval-shaped fuselage had an all-metal covering. All of the wing and fuselage sections were manufactured separately, during which they were outfitted with all of the required equipment in advance of final assembly being performed, as a measure intended to accelerate the rate of production. The Lancaster was equipped with a retractable main undercarriage and fixed tailwheel; the hydraulically-actuated main landing gear raised rearwards into recesses within the inner engine nacelles. The distinctive tail unit of the aircraft was outfitted with a large twin elliptical fins and rudder arrangement.

Like any aeroplane, the Lancaster was not viceless in its handling. In a dive, it had a tendency to go more deeply into the dive as speed increased. Not all aeroplanes did this, for example, the Halifax tended to get increasingly tail-heavy as speed increased, and thus fly itself out of the dive. Furthermore, the Lancaster suffered longitudinal instability at speeds above 200 mph (320 km/h).

=== Crew accommodation ===
The standard crew for a Lancaster consisted of seven men, stationed in various positions in the fuselage. Starting at the nose, the bomb aimer had two positions to man. His primary location was lying prone on the floor of the nose of the aircraft, with access to the bombsight controls facing forward, with the Mark XIV bomb sight on his left and bomb release selectors on the right. He also used his view through the large transparent perspex nose cupola to assist the navigator with map reading. To man the Frazer Nash FN5 nose turret, he stood up placing himself in position behind the triggers of the twin .303 in (7.7 mm) guns. Ammunition for the turret was 1,000 rounds per gun. The bomb aimer's position contained the nose emergency hatch in the floor.

Compared with other contemporary aircraft, the Lancaster was not an easy aircraft to escape from as its nose emergency hatch was only 22 in × 26.5 in (56 cm × 67 cm) in size; only 15 per cent of the crew of downed Lancasters were able to bail out successfully. In contrast, in a Halifax or Stirling (which both had an escape hatch 2 in (5.1 cm) wider), 25 per cent of downed aircrew bailed out successfully. In American bombers (albeit in daylight raids where the escaping crew could better see what to do) the success rate was as high as 50 per cent. British scientist Freeman Dyson, at that time a 19-year-old member of Bomber Command's Operational Research Section who had yet to win a degree, wrote after the war of how the Operational Research Section gathered these statistics by studying lists of aviators who survived the loss of their bombers to reappear in POW camps. The Operational Research Section's attempts to have the Lancaster escape hatch improved were unsuccessful.

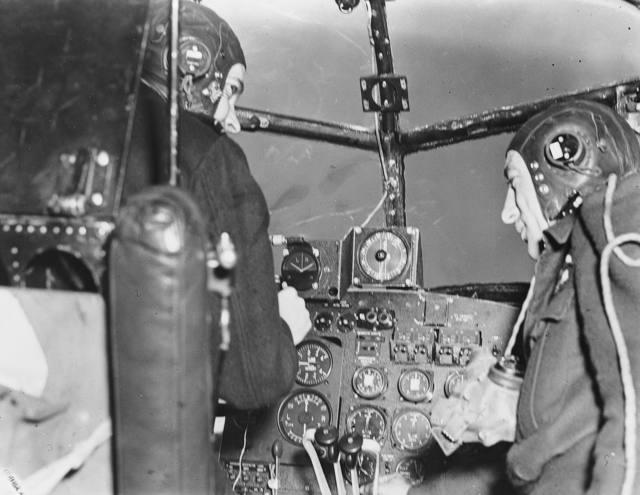
Lancaster pilot at the controls, left, flight engineer at right

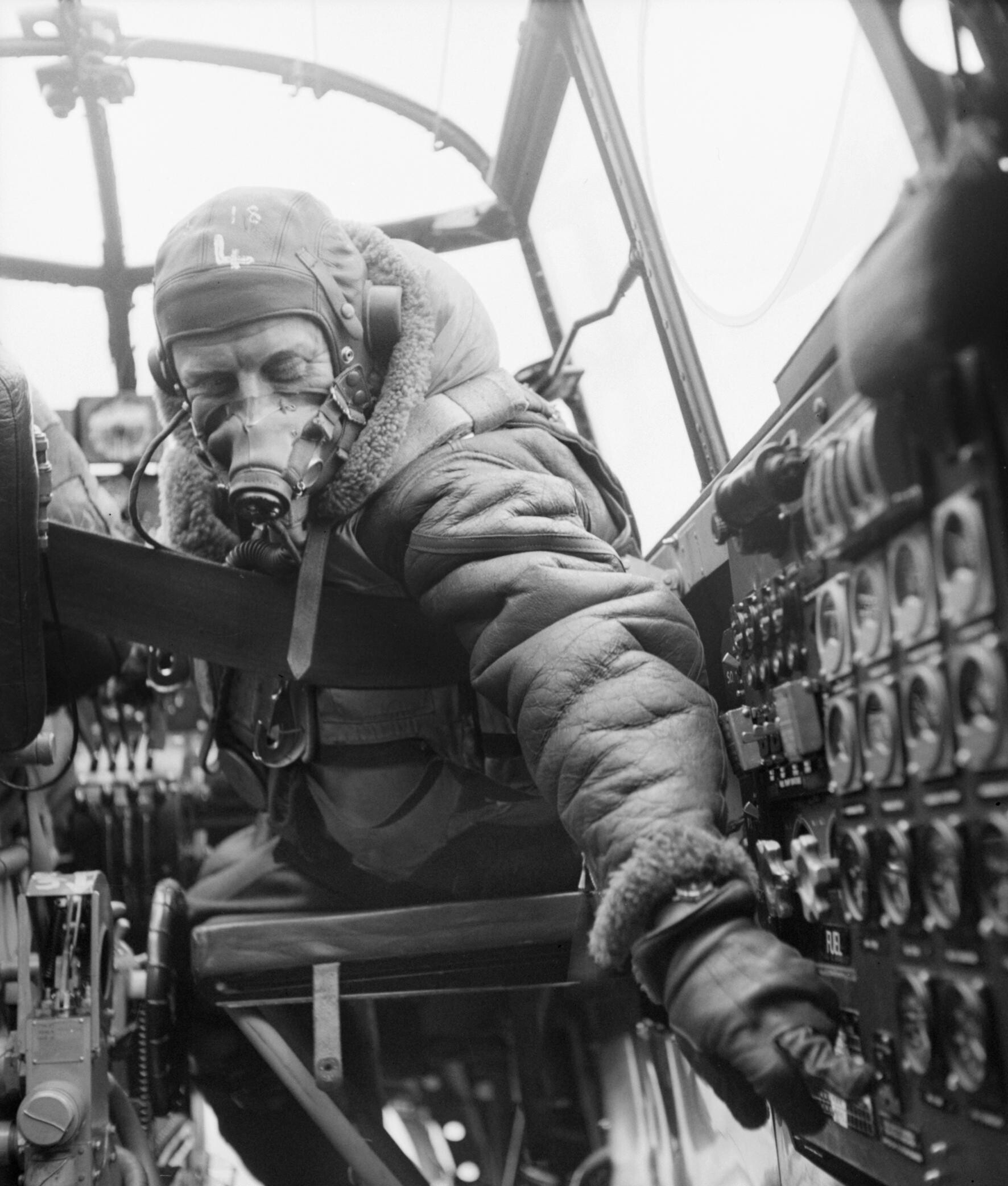
The flight engineer checks control panel from his seat

On the roof of the bomb bay the pilot and flight engineer sat side by side under the expansive canopy, with the pilot sitting on the left on a raised portion of the floor (almost all British bombers, and most German bombers, had only a single pilot seat as opposed to the American practice of carrying two pilots, or at least having controls for two pilots installed). The flight engineer sat on a collapsible seat (known as a "second dicky seat") to the pilot's right, with the fuel selectors and gauges on a panel behind him and to his right. The pilot and other crew members could use the panel above the cockpit as an auxiliary emergency exit while the mid-upper gunner was expected to use the rear entrance door to leave the aircraft. The tail gunner escaped by rotating his turret to the rear, opening the door in the back of the turret, passing into the fuselage, and clipping on a parachute that was hung on the side wall. He could then exit through the rear entrance door.

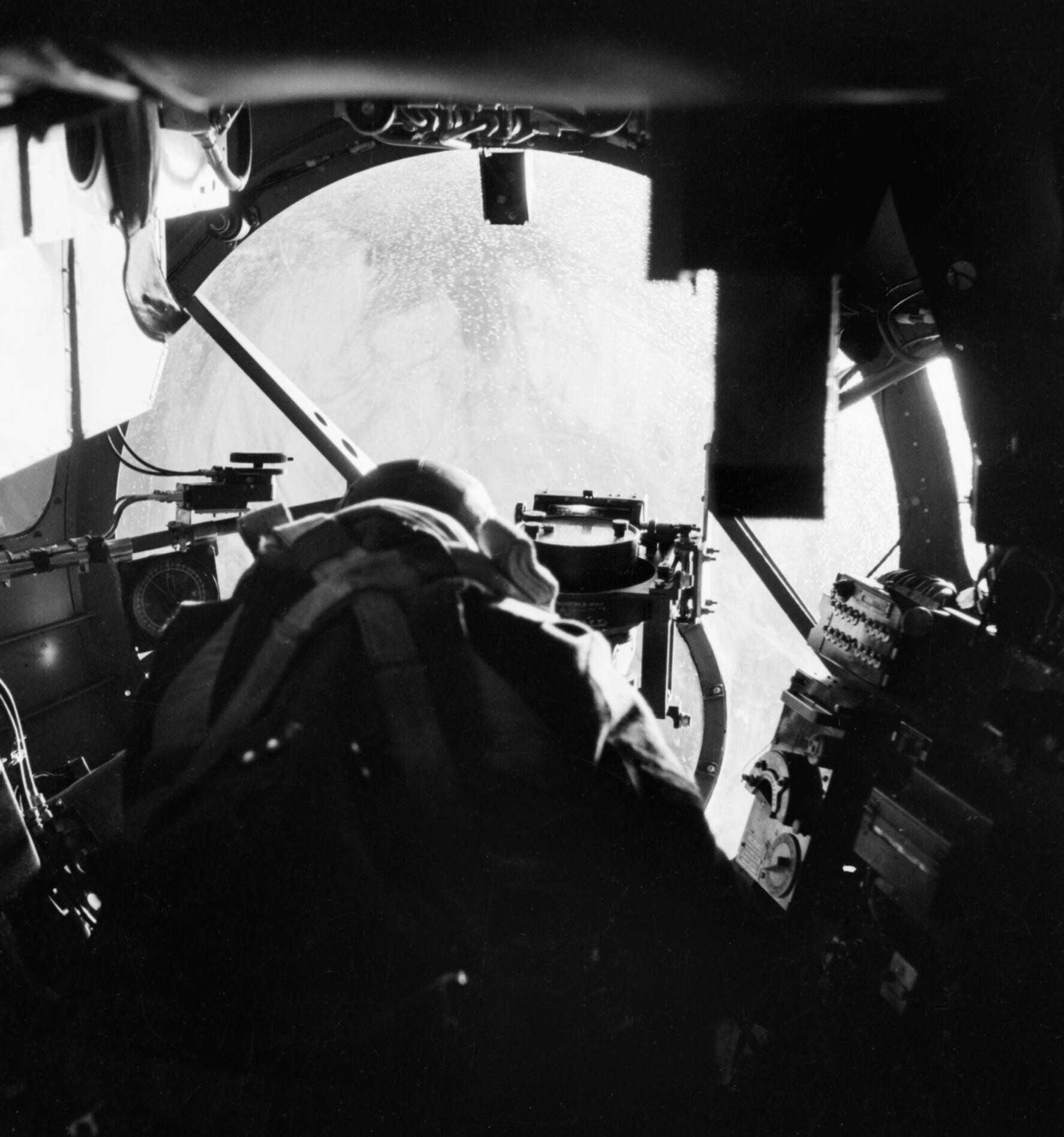
Bomb aimer in his position in the nose

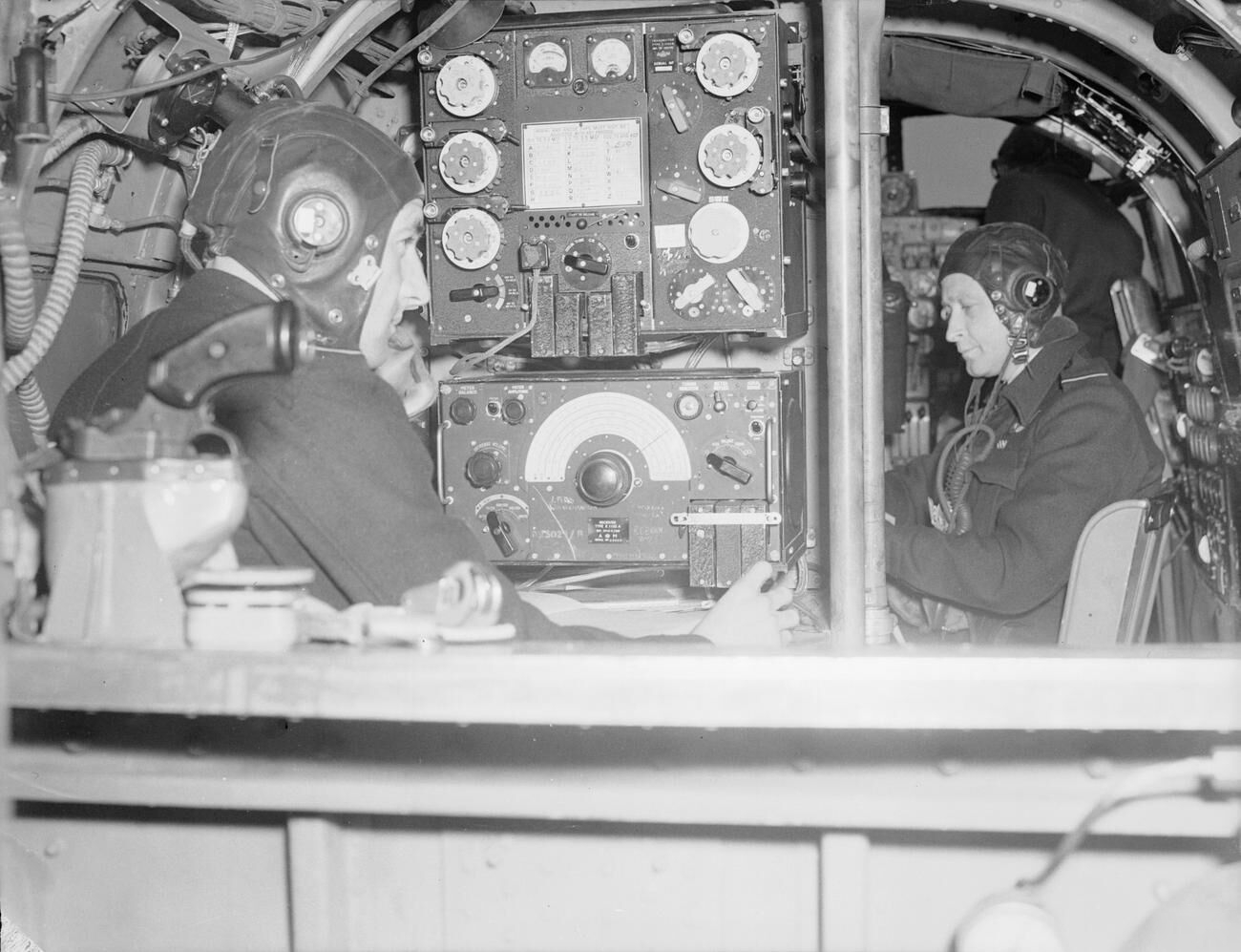
Inside G for George of No. 460 Squadron. Looking forward between wing spars. At left is the wireless operator, and at right is the navigator

Behind the pilot and flight engineer, and behind a curtain fitted to allow him to use light to work, sat the navigator. His position faced to port with a chart table in front of him. An instrument panel showing the airspeed, altitude, and other information required for navigation was mounted on the side of the fuselage above the chart table. The Wireless operator's radios were mounted on the left-hand end of the chart table, facing the rear of the aircraft. Behind these and facing forwards the wireless operator sat on a seat at the front of the main spar. On his left was a window, and above him was the astrodome, used for visual signalling and by the navigator for celestial navigation.

Behind the wireless operator were the two spars of the wing, which created a major obstacle for crew members moving down the fuselage even on the ground. At the end of the bomb bay was the mid-upper gunner's turret, at which the floor dropped down to the fuselage's bottom. His position allowed a 360° view over the top of the aircraft, with two Browning .303 Mark IIs to protect the aircraft from above and to the side. The mid-upper gunner sat on a rectangle of canvas that was slung beneath the turret and would stay in position throughout the flight. The turret had 1,000 rounds of ammunition per gun.

To the rear of the turret was the side crew door, on the starboard side of the fuselage. This was the main entrance to the aircraft, and also could be used as an emergency exit. The Elsan chemical toilet, a type of aircraft lavatory, was located near the spars for the tailplane. At the extreme tail-end of the fuselage, the rear gunner sat in his exposed position in the tail turret, which was entered through a small hatch in the rear of the fuselage. Depending on the size of the rear gunner, the area was so cramped that the gunner would often hang his parachute on a hook inside the fuselage, near the turret doors. Neither the mid-upper nor the rear gunner's position was heated, and the gunners had to wear electrically heated suits to prevent hypothermia and frostbite.

=== Armament ===
==== Defensive armament ====
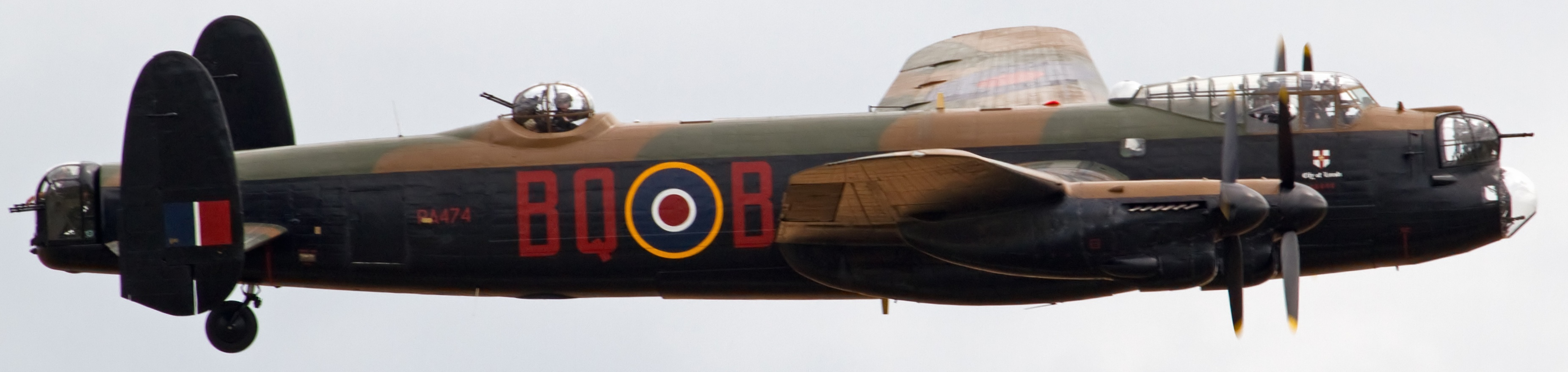
Battle of Britain Memorial Flight Lancaster Mk I PA474 in flight showing nose, dorsal and tail .303 Browning gun positions

The Avro Lancaster was initially equipped with four Nash & Thompson Frazer Nash hydraulically operated turrets mounted in the nose, tail, mid-upper and underside. The original tail turret was equipped with four Browning .303 Mark II machine guns and all other turrets with two such machine guns.

Freeman Dyson wrote after the war that he and his Operational Research Section colleagues put forward a case for the removal of the Lancaster's gun turrets. They argued that this would reduce the loss rate by increasing the Lancaster's cruising speed by up to 50 mph (80 km/h), assuming the bomb load was not increased; this would make the bomber harder to intercept. Dyson also privately believed that removing the turret gunners from the crew would at least reduce the lives lost with each aircraft. The proposal was not adopted.

===== Nose turret =====
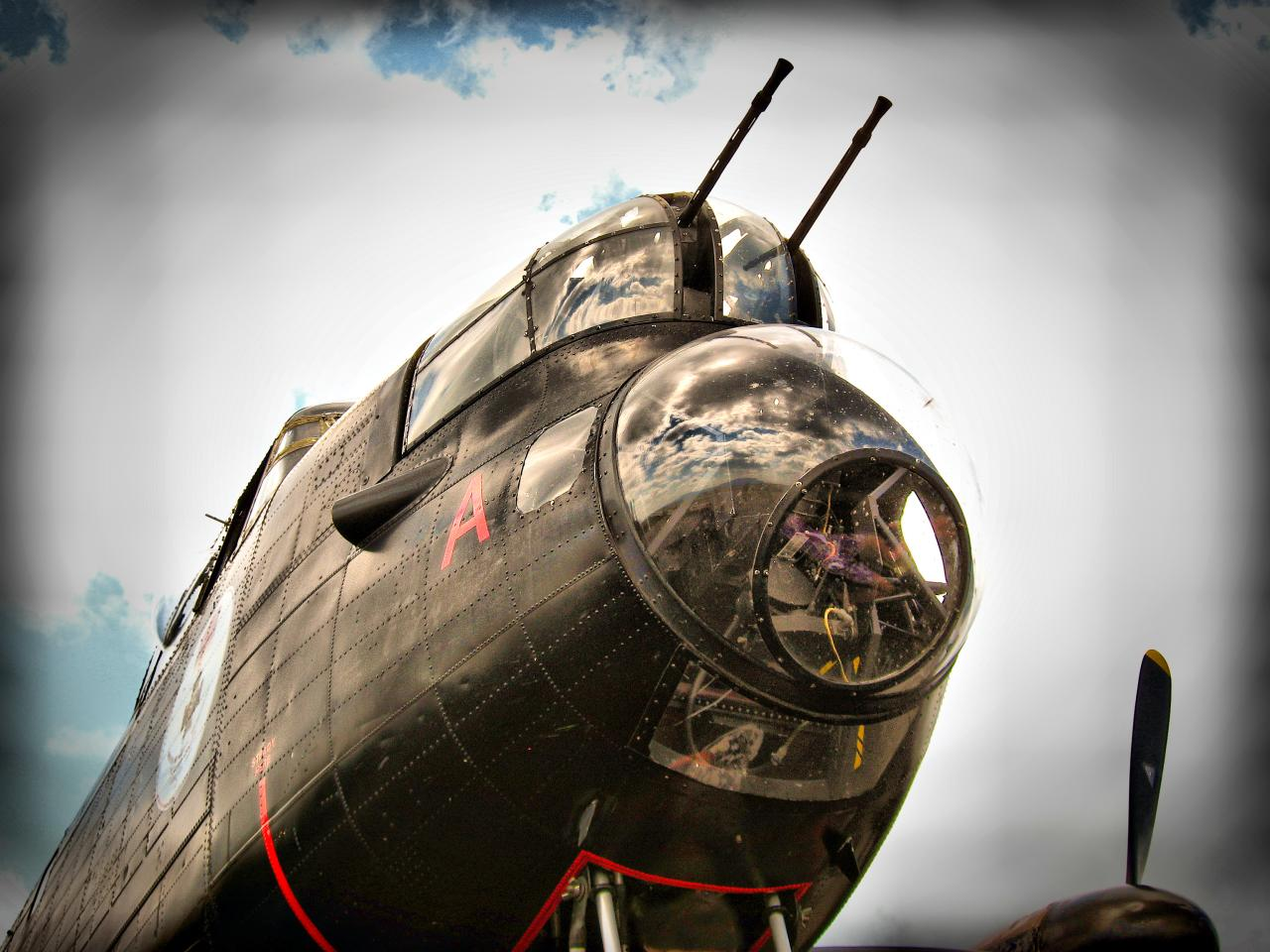
Mk.X nose with twin .303 Brownings in turret over bomb-aimer's position

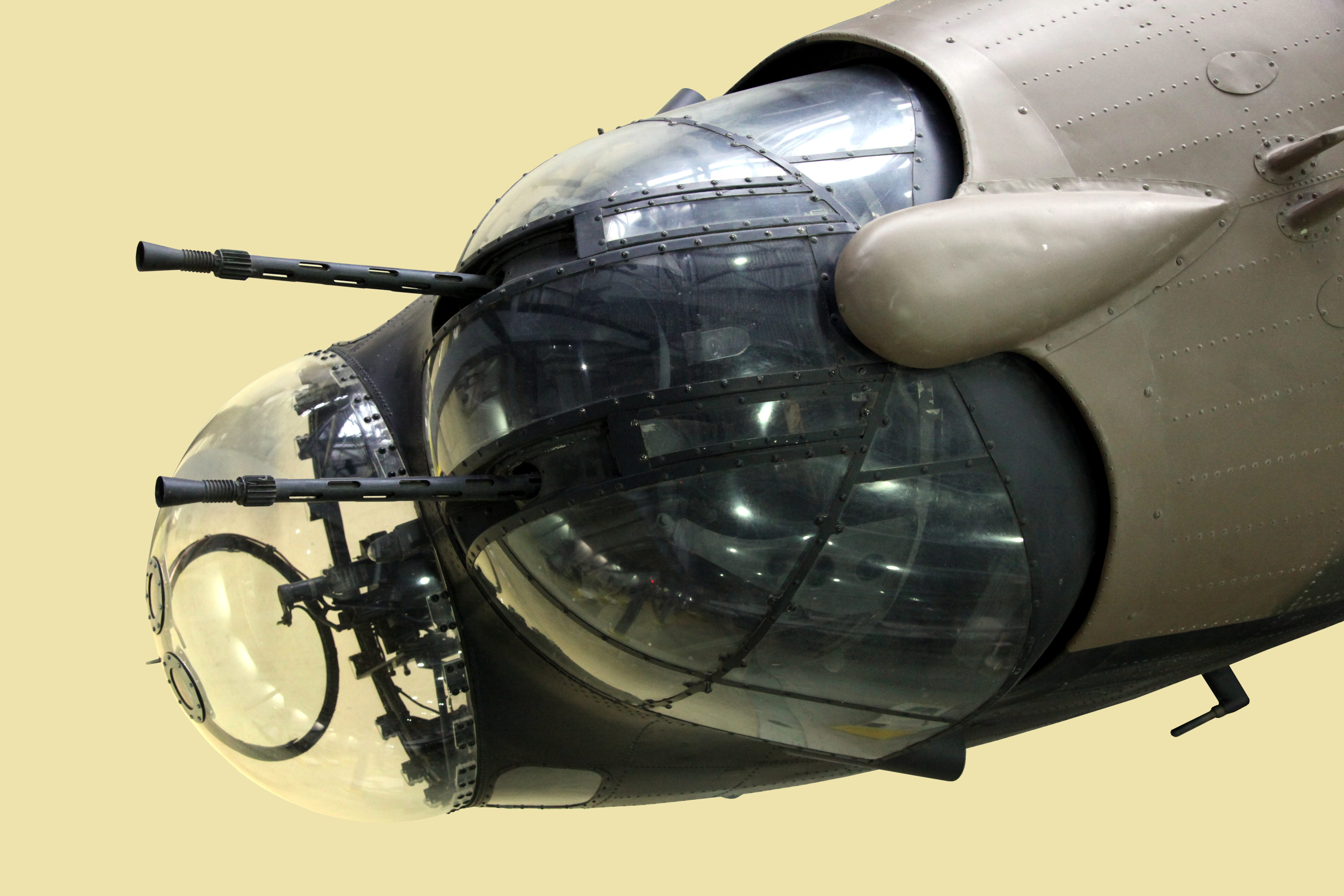
Nose turret from above, and bomber aimer's station

Only the FN-5A nose turret, which was similar to the FN-5 used on the preceding Avro Manchester, the Vickers Wellington and the Short Stirling, remained unchanged during the life of the design, except where it was removed.

===== Ventral turret =====
The ventral (underside) FN-64 turret quickly proved to be dead weight, being both difficult to sight because it relied on a periscope which limited the gunner's view to a 20-degree arc, and too slow to keep a target within its sights. (Note: Similar view and speed problems were commonplace in the era, having particularly afflicted the ventral turret in the North American B-25 Mitchell and other bombers.) Aside from early B.Is and the prototype B.IIs, the FN-64 was almost never used. When the Luftwaffe began using Schräge Musik to make attacks from below in the winter of 1943/1944, modifications were made, including downward observation blisters mounted behind the bomb aimer's blister and official and unofficial mounts for .50 in (12.7 mm) machine guns or even 20 mm (0.79 in) cannon, firing through the ventral holes of the removed FN-64. The fitting of these guns was hampered as the same ventral position was used for mounting the H2S blister, which limited installations to those aircraft fitted with bulged bomb bays which interfered with the H2S.

===== Mid-upper turret =====
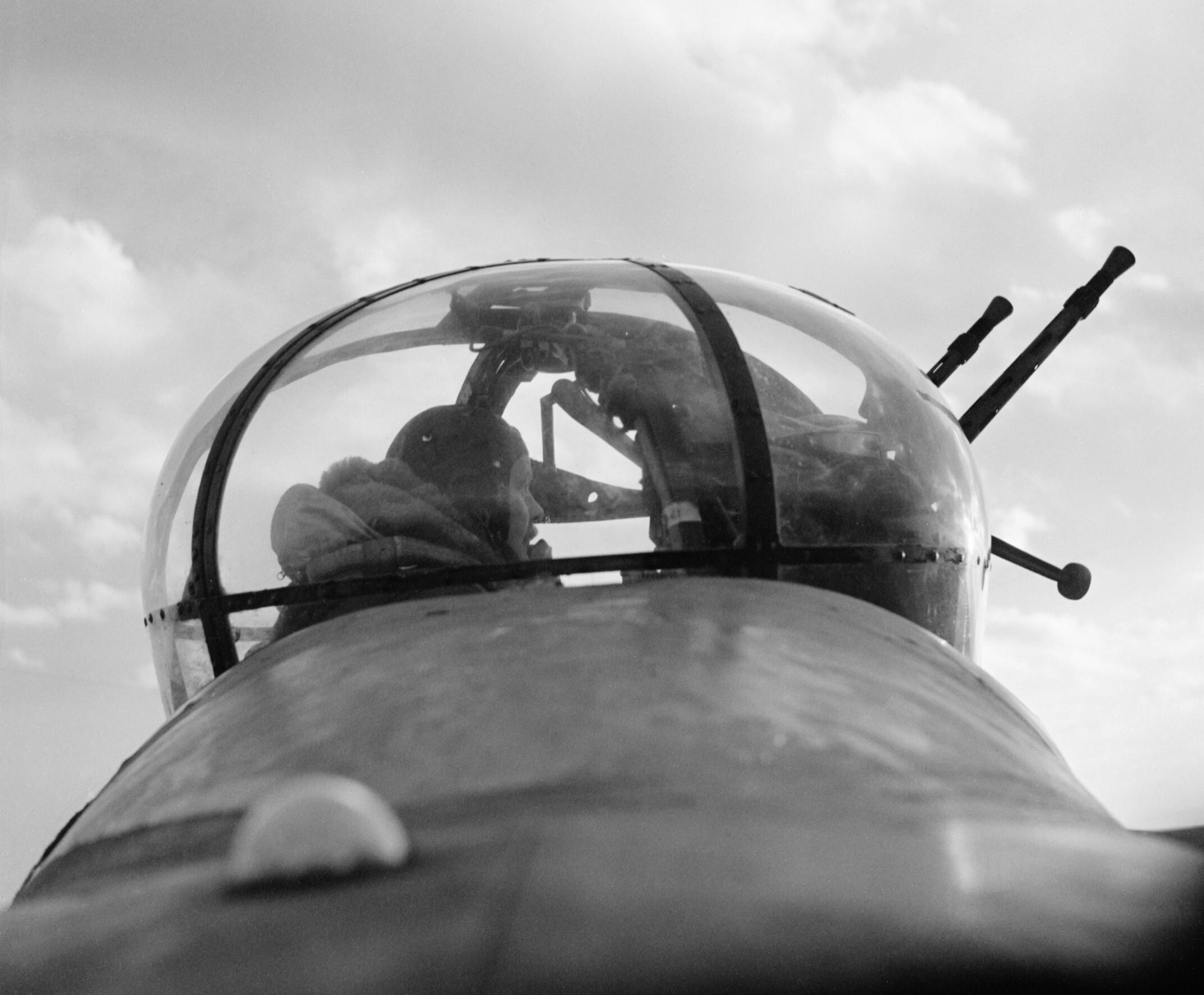
Gunner in Fraser Nash FN50 mid-upper turret with twin .303 Brownings, February 1943

The mid-upper (dorsal or top) turret was an FN-50 on early examples and the very similar FN-150 with improved sights and controls on later examples. On all but the earliest examples, this turret was surrounded by a coaming which provided a track for a cam-operated interrupter device which prevented the gunner from shooting the tail of his own aircraft. The Mk.VII and late Mk.X Lancasters used the heavier, electrically controlled Martin 250 CE 23A turret equipped with two .50 in (13 mm) machine guns which was mounted further forward to preserve the aircraft's longitudinal balance, and because it had an internal mechanism to prevent firing on the aircraft itself, it did not require a coaming. (Note: The Martin 250 CE 23A turret was the same unit which had been equipped upon many American bombers, such as the Consolidated B-24 Liberator.) Other experimental turrets were tried out, including the FN-79 and the Boulton-Paul Type H barbette system.

===== Tail turret =====
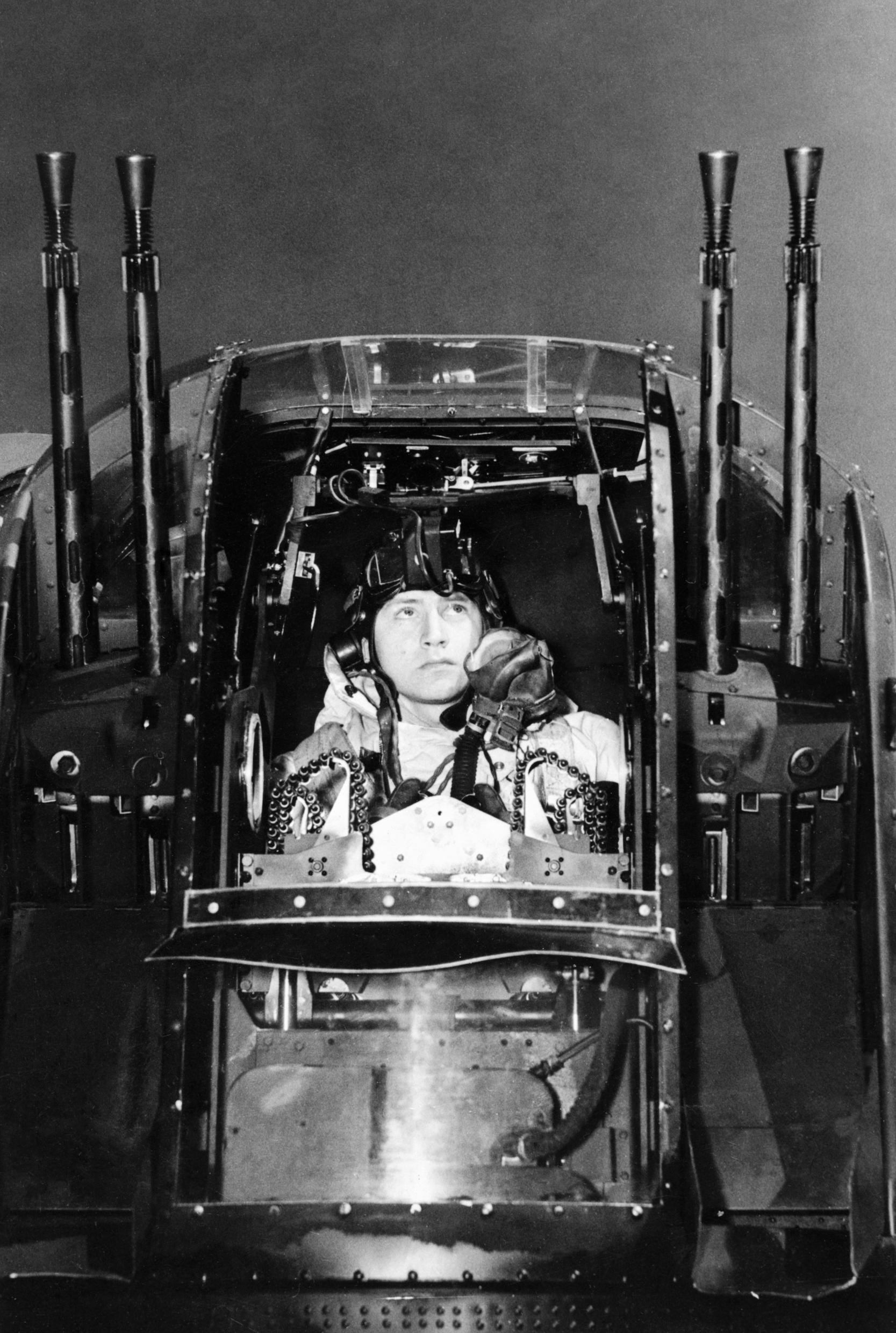
Gunner in the Nash & Thompson FN20 tail turret

The tail turret was the most important defensive position and carried the heaviest armament. Despite this, the turrets used, starting with the FN-20, were never entirely satisfactory and numerous designs were tried. The FN-20 was replaced by the very similar FN-120 which used an improved gyroscopic gun sight (GGS). Many rear gunners insisted on having the centre section of perspex removed from the turret to improve visibility. The transparencies were difficult to see through at night, particularly when trying to keep watch for enemy night fighters that appeared without notice astern and below the aircraft when getting into position to open fire. This removal of perspex from the turret was called the "Gransden Lodge" modification. Ammunition for the tail turret was 2,500 rounds per gun. Due to the weight, the ammunition was stored in tanks situated near the mid-upper turret's position and fed rearward in runways down the back of the fuselage to the turret.

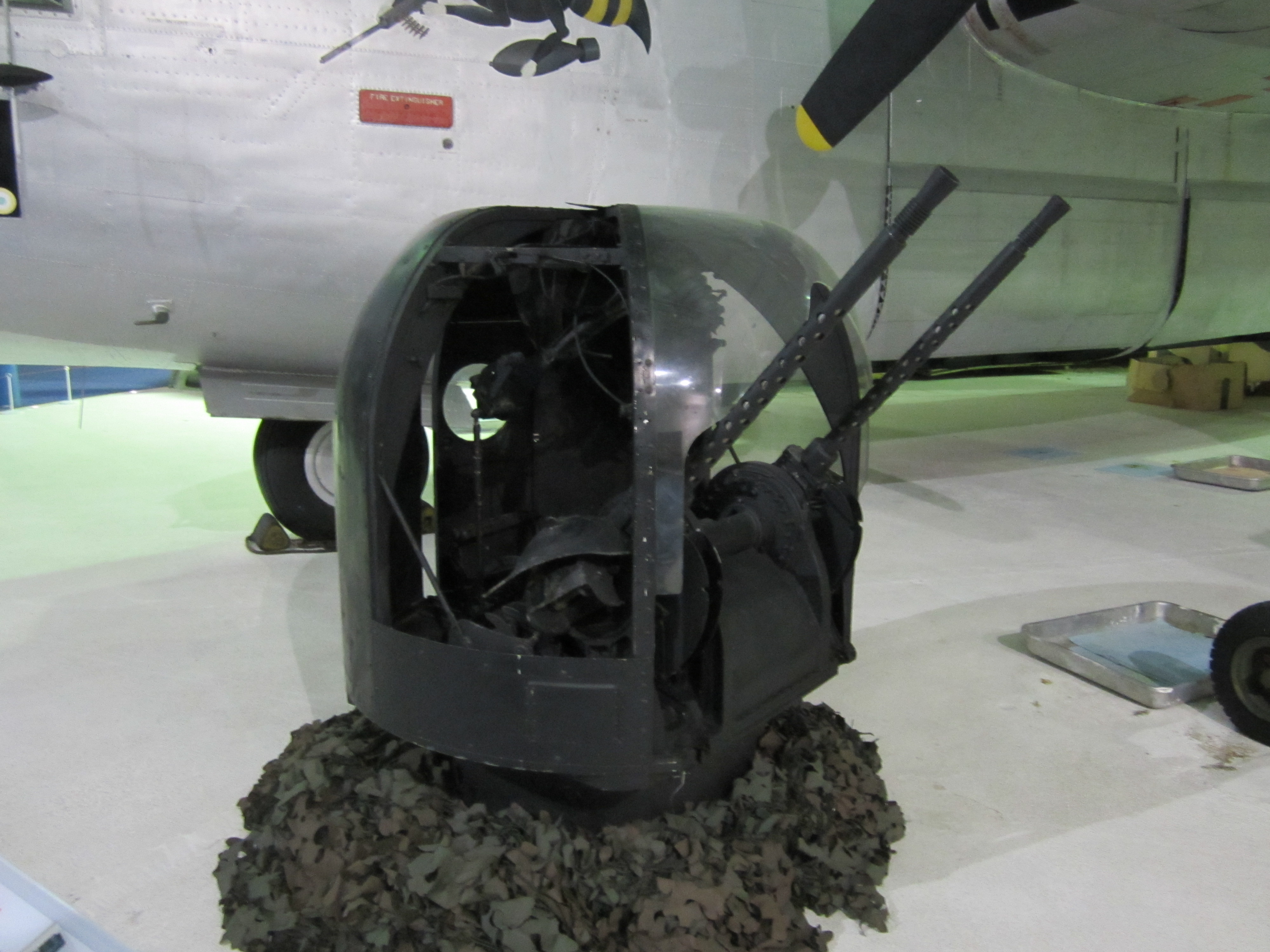
The Rose turret

Gunners using both the FN-20 and 120 removed perspex and armour from the turret to improve visibility, but trials by the RAF showed that a de Havilland Mosquito night fighter was still able to get within a very short distance of the tail gunner without being spotted, confirming what the Luftwaffe had already realised. The Rose turret attempted to improve on the FN turrets by being completely open to the rear (improving visibility and allowing easier emergency egress) and by being fitted with two .50 in (13 mm) machine guns. It was installed in a small number of Lancasters but never became common.

Ultimately radar, rather than improved visibility, made the turret more effective. The FN-121 was the Automatic Gun Laying Turret (AGLT), an FN-120 fitted with 'Village Inn' gun-laying radar. Aircraft fitted with Village Inn were used as bait, flying behind the main formations to confront the night fighters that followed the formations and shot down stragglers. This significantly reduced operational losses; and gun-laying radar was added to the last versions of the turret. Before the end of the war, Lancasters built in the UK standardised on the FN-82 fitted with two .50 in (13 mm) machine guns and a gun-laying radar as production allowed, which was also used on early models of the Avro Lincoln. The disadvantage of all radar and radio transmitting systems is that attacking forces can locate aircraft by picking up transmissions.

==== Bombs ====
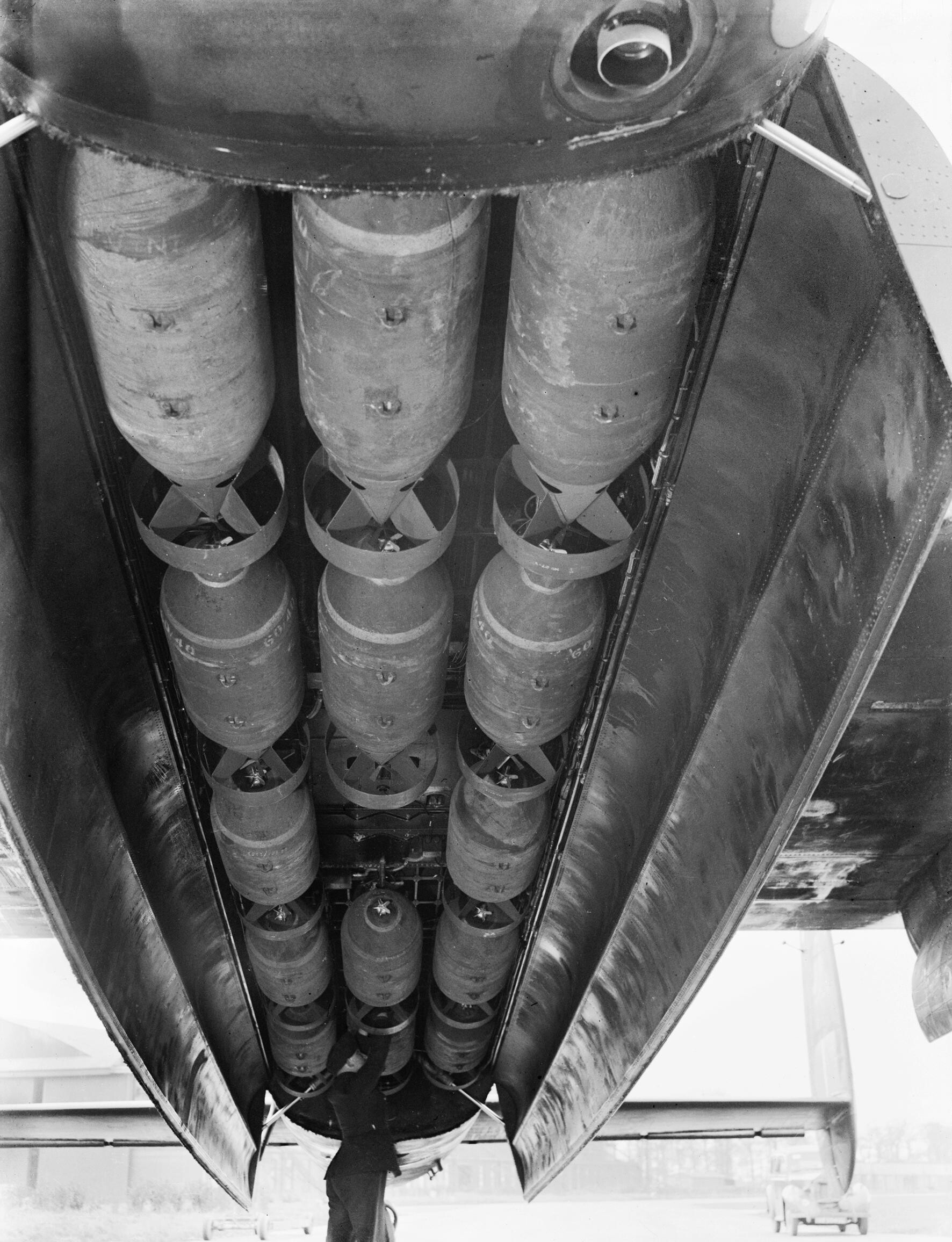
"Abnormal" industrial demolition load of 14 1,000-pound medium capacity high-explosive bombs

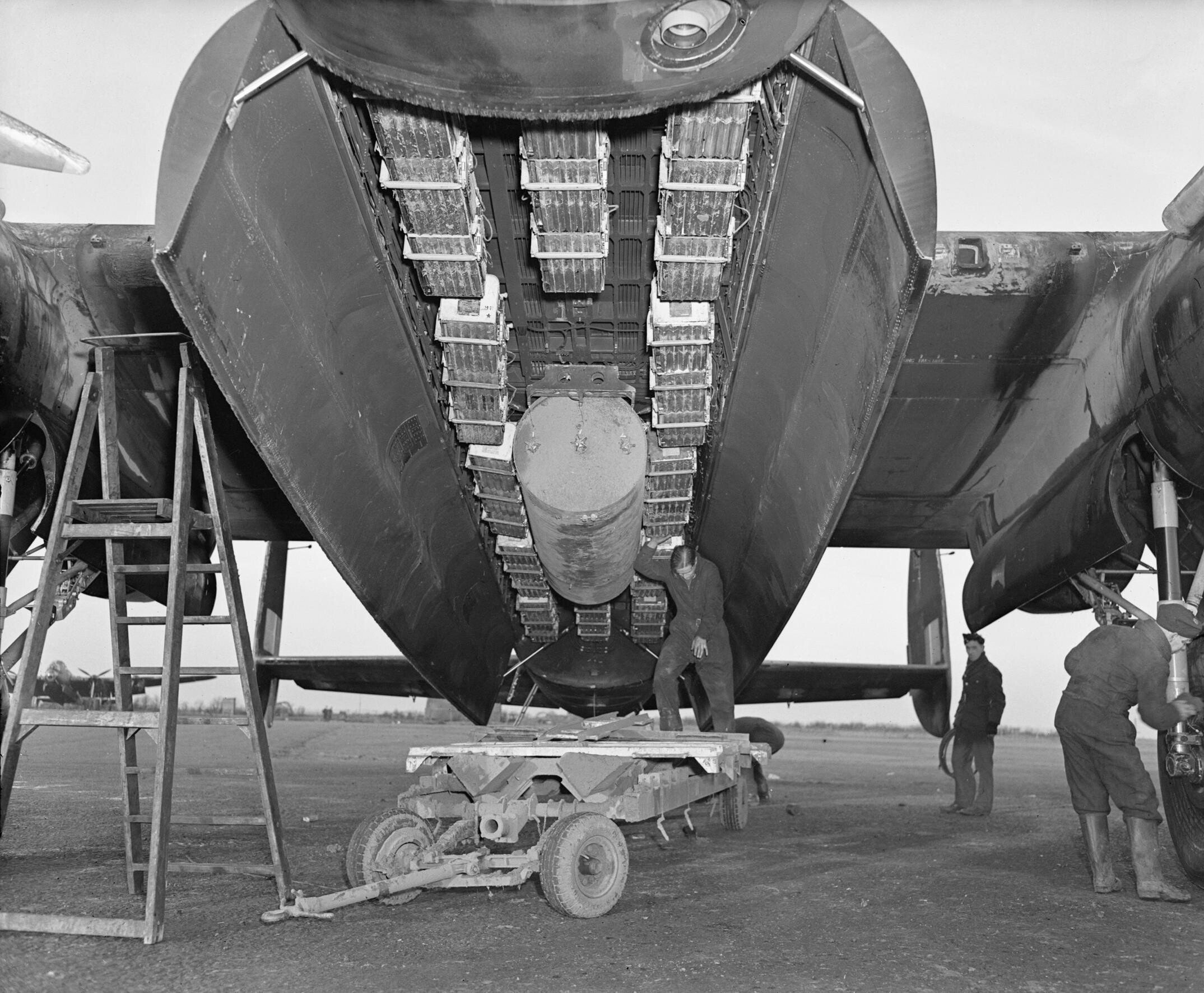
"Usual" area bombardment load – a 4,000-pound "Cookie" blast bomb with 12 Small Bomb Containers, each with 236 4-lb incendiary bombs

An important feature of the Lancaster was its unobstructed 33 ft (10 m) long bomb bay. At first, the heaviest bomb carried was the 4,000 lb (1,800 kg) high capacity HC "Cookie". Bulged doors were added to 30 per cent of B.Is to allow the aircraft to carry 8,000 lb (3,600 kg) and later 12,000 lb (5,400 kg) "Cookies". The Lancaster also carried a variety of smaller weapons, including the Small Bomb Container (SBC) which held 236 4 lb (1.8 kg) or 24 30 lb (14 kg) incendiary and explosive incendiary bomblets; 500 lb (230 kg) and 1,000 lb (450 kg) General Purpose High Explosive (GP/HE) bombs (these came in a variety of designs); 1,850 lb (840 kg) parachute deployed magnetic or acoustic mines, or 2,000 lb (910 kg) armour-piercing (AP) bombs; 250 lb (110 kg) Semi-Armour-Piercing (SAP) bombs, used up to 1942 against submarines; post-1942: 250 lb (110 kg) or 500 lb (230 kg) anti-submarine depth charges.

In 1943, 617 Squadron was created to carry out Operation Chastise, the raid against the Ruhr dams. This unit was equipped with B.III (Specials), officially designated the "Type 464 (Provisioning)", modified to carry the 9,250 lb (4,200 kg) "Upkeep" bouncing bomb. (Note: In period material, the "Upkeep" bouncing bomb was frequently referred to as being a mine, rather than as a bomb.) The bomb bay doors were removed and the ends of the bomb bay were covered with fairings. "Upkeep" was suspended on laterally pivoted, vee-shaped struts which sprang apart beamwise when the bomb-release button was pressed. A drive belt and pulley to rotate the bomb at 500 rpm was mounted on the starboard strut and driven by a hydraulic motor housed in the forward fairing. The mid-upper turret was removed and a more bulbous bomb aimer's blister was fitted; this, as "Mod. 780", later became standard on all Lancasters, while the bombsight was replaced by a simple aiming device that consisted of a simple triangle of wood with a peephole at one corner and a nail in each of the other corners such that at the correct distance the nails coincided with the towers on the dams. Because each dam was a different width between the towers, each plane carried two or three different sights. Two Aldis lights were fitted in the rear bomb bay fairing, aimed forward so the bomb aimer could see the converging lights below his blister in the nose; the optimum height for dropping "Upkeep" was 60 ft (18 m) and, when shone on the relatively smooth waters of the dam's reservoirs, the light beams converged into a figure 8 when the Lancaster was flying at the correct height. The Type 464 Lancaster was also fitted with VHF radios (normally reserved for fighters) so that Gibson, the squadron leader, could control the operation while over the target, an early example of what became the master bomber role.

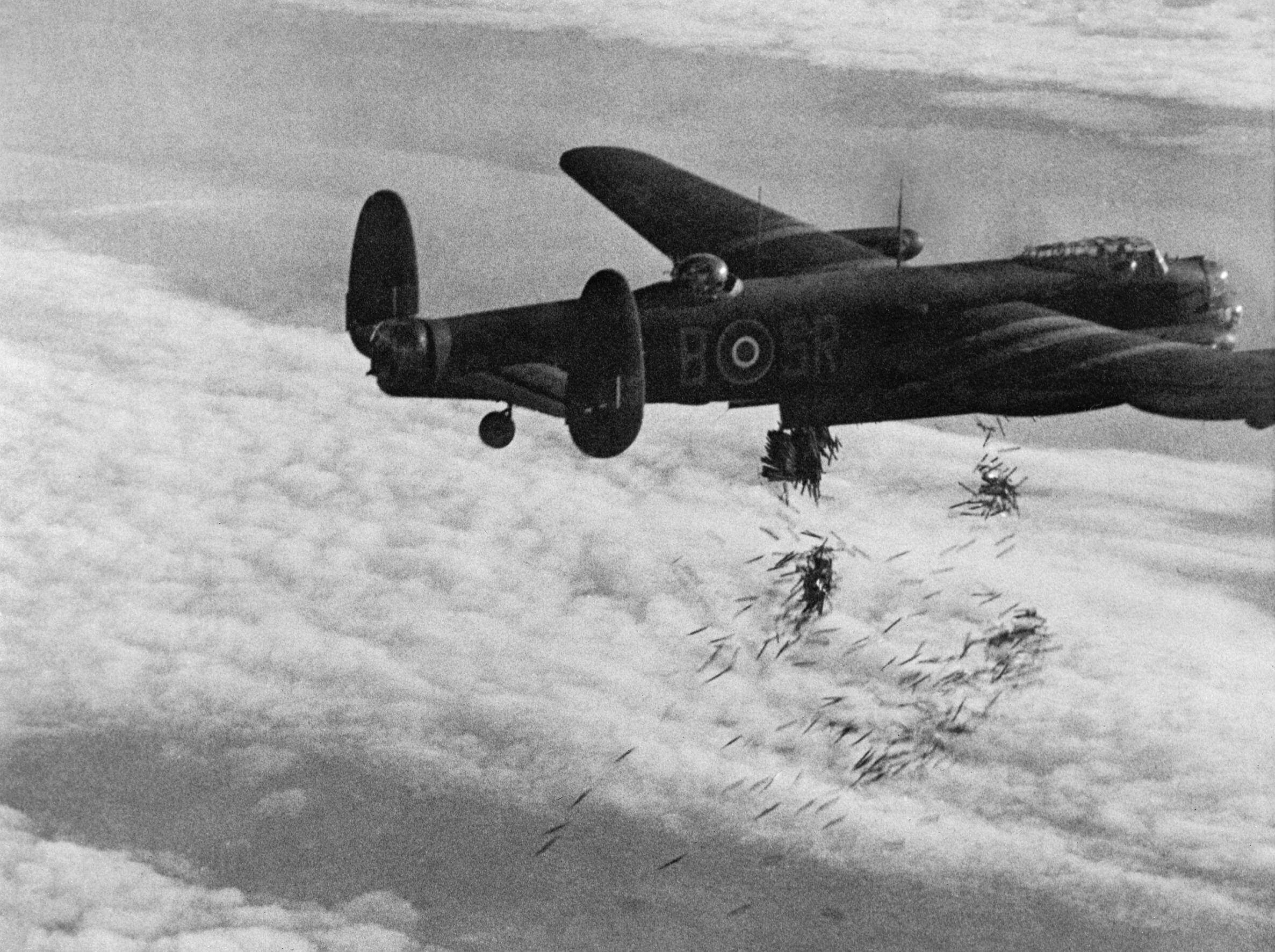
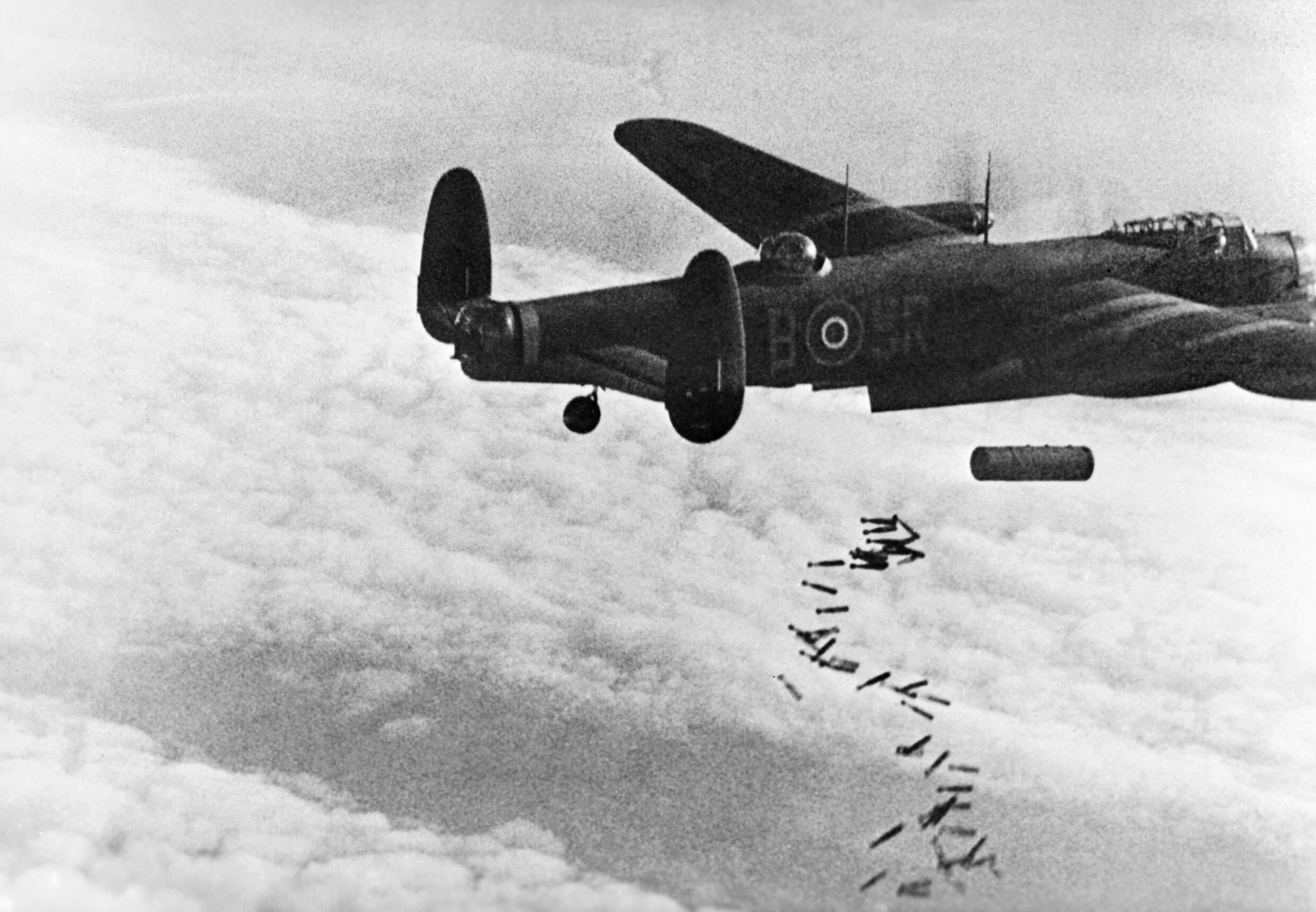
Lancaster B.I of No. 101 Squadron RAF dropping bundles of 'Window' followed by 30 lb (14 kg) incendiaries and a 4,000 lb (1,800 kg) "cookie"

After the 'Dam Busters' raid 617 Squadron was converted to a high-altitude precision bombing squadron in preparation for the arrival of Barnes Wallis's forthcoming Earthquake bombs for attacking special and hardened targets, and while they were training for this the bouncing bomb variants of B.I Specials had the spars and equipment removed and were then modified to carry the 21 ft (6.4 m) long 12,000 lb (5,400 kg) "Tallboy" bomb, a scaled-down version of the upcoming 25.5 ft (7.8 m) long 22,000 lb (10,000 kg) "Grand Slam" "earthquake" bombs which were still being built. Aircraft intended to carry the "Grand Slam" required extensive modifications. These included the removal of the dorsal turret and of two guns from the rear turret, the removal of the cockpit armour plating (the pilot's seatback), and the installation of Rolls-Royce Merlin Mk 24 engines for better take-off performance. The bomb bay doors were removed and the rear end of the bomb bay cut away to clear the tail of the bomb. Later the nose turret was also removed to further improve performance. A strengthened undercarriage and stronger mainwheels, later used by the Avro Lincoln, were fitted. (Note: The weight in kilograms of the "Tall Boy" and "Grand Slam" bombs differs according to their source. The figures given are the most common.)

Specific bomb loads were standardised and given code names by Bomber Command:

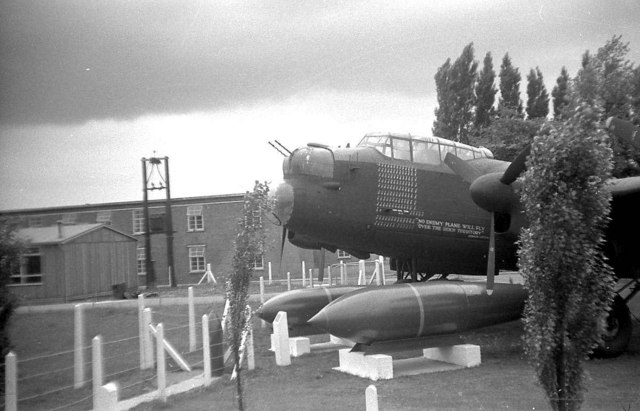
Tallboy bombs displayed with a standard R5868 Lancaster at RAF Scampton.

Codename	Type of raid or target	Bomb load
"Arson"	incendiary area bombing	14 SBC, each with 236 x 4 lb (1.8 kg) Incendiary and Explosive Incendiary bomblets, total 3,304.
"Abnormal"	factories, railway yards, dockyards	14 x 1,000 lb (450 kg) GP/HE bombs using both impact and long delay (up to 144 hours) fuses.
"Cookie"—or—"Plumduff"	Blast, demolition and fire	1 x 4,000 lb (1,800 kg) impact-fused HC bomb. 3 x 1,000 lb (450 kg) GP/HE bombs, and up to 6 SBCs with 1,416 incendiary bomblets.
"Gardening"	Mining of ports, canals, rivers and seaways	6 x 1,850 lb (840 kg) parachute mines.
"No-Ball"	V-1 flying bomb launch sites	1 x 4,000 lb (1,800 kg) impact fused HC and up to 18 x 500 lb (230 kg) GP bombs, with both impact and delay fusing.
"Piece"	Docks, fortifications and ships	6 x 2,000 lb (910 kg) short-delay fused AP bombs, plus other GP/HE bombs based on local needs or availability.
"Plumduff-Plus"	Heavy industry	1 x 8,000 lb (3,600 kg) impact or barometric fused HC and up to 6 x 500 lb (230 kg) impact or delay fused GP/HE bombs.
"Usual"	Blast and incendiary area bombing	1 x 4,000 lb (1,800 kg) impact-fused HC bomb, and 12 SBCs with a total of 2,832 incendiary bomblets.
no code name given	Medium-range low altitude tactical raids	6 x 1,000 lb (450 kg) short and long delay fused GP/HE bombs, additional 250 lb (110 kg) GP/HE bombs sometimes added.
no code name given	Submarines	(up to 1942): 5 x 250 lb (110 kg) short-delay fuse SAP bombs for surfaced U-boats; (post-1942): 6 x 500 lb (230 kg) and 3 x 250 lb (110 kg) anti-submarine depth charge bombs.

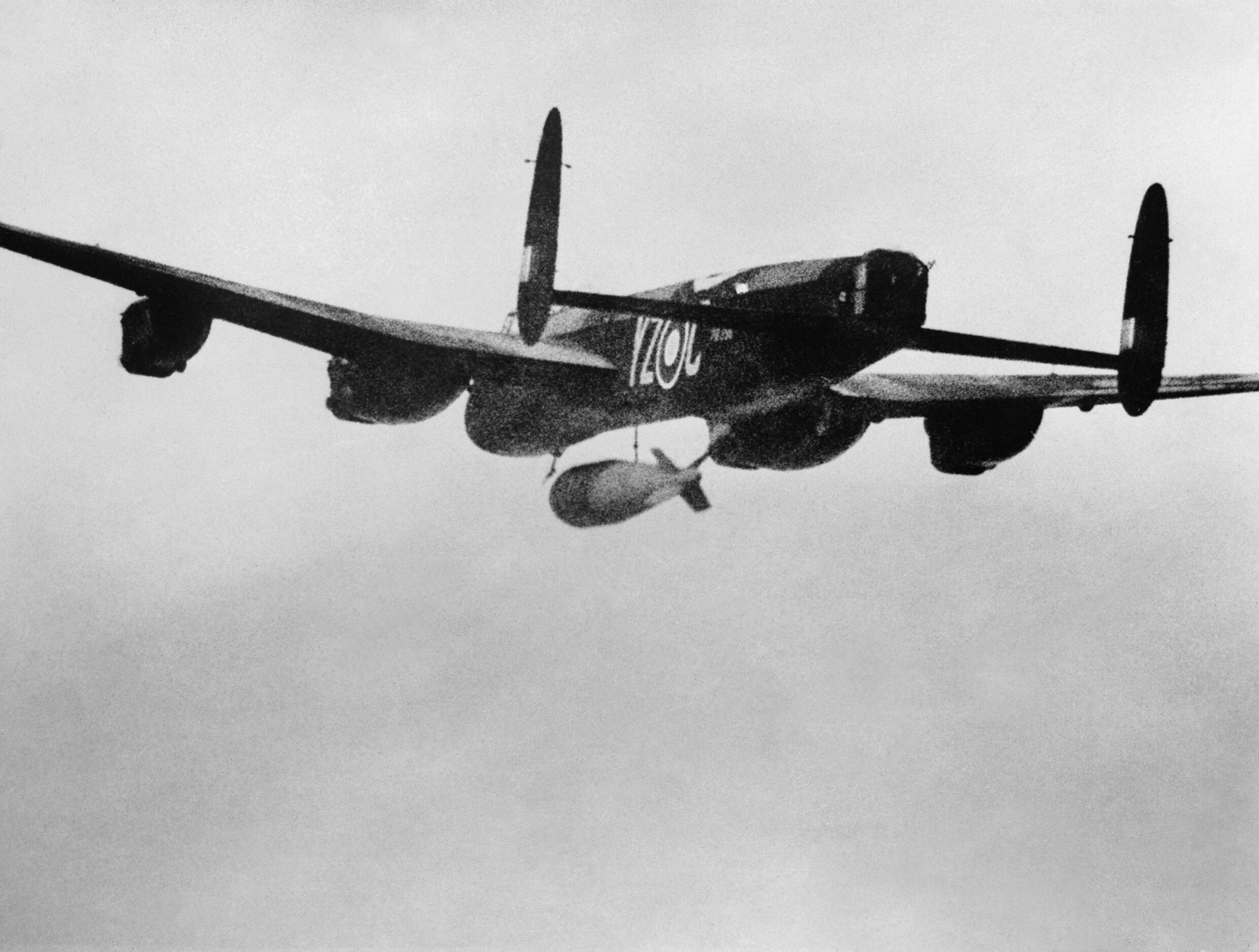
A 617 Squadron Lancaster dropping a Grand Slam bomb on the Arnsberg viaduct, March 1945.

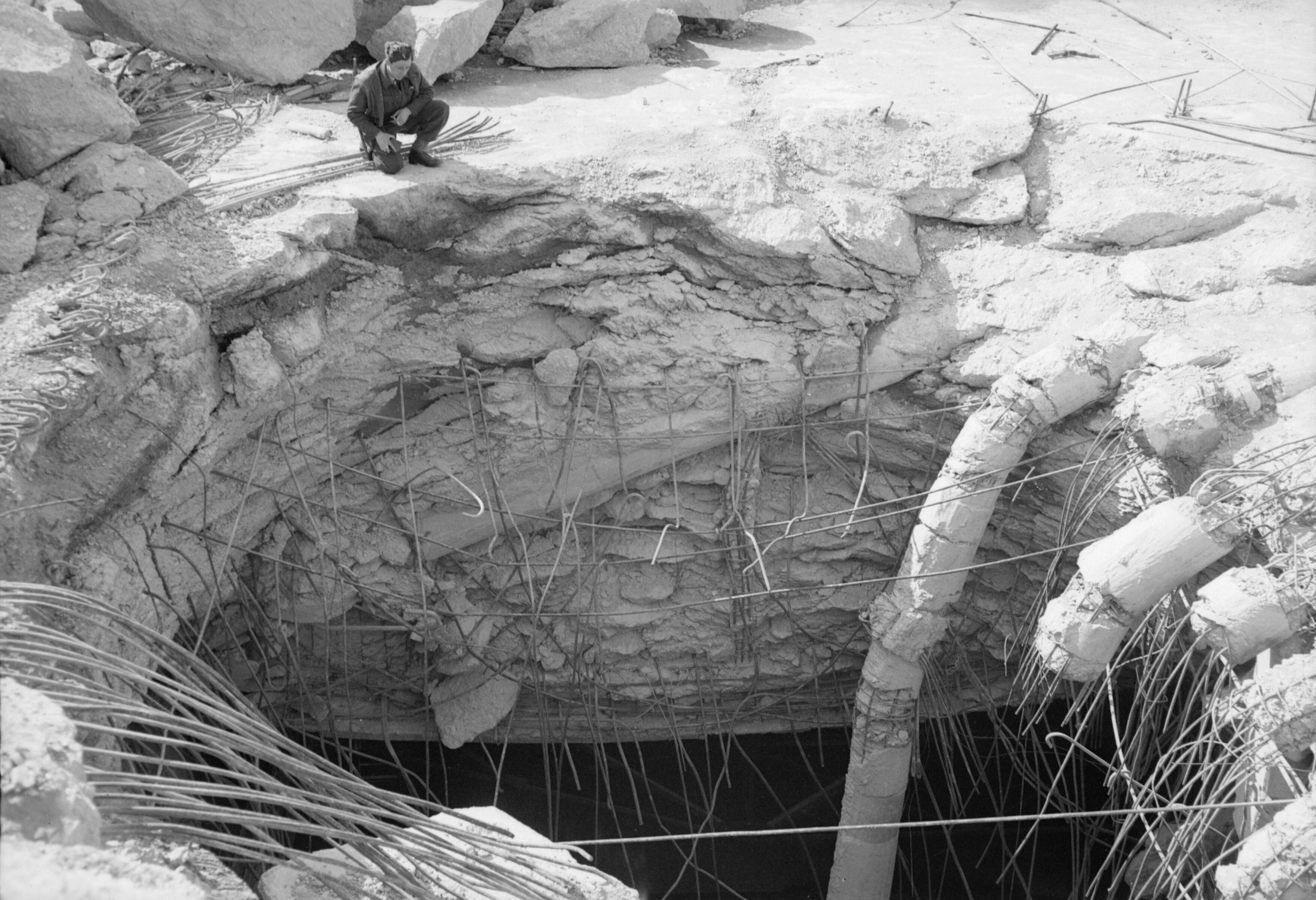
An RAF officer inspects the hole left by a Grand Slam in the reinforced concrete roof of the Valentin submarine factory in Bremen, Germany

Special-purpose weapons and codenames	Type of target	Weapon
"Upkeep"	Dams	1 x 9,250 lb (4,200 kg), hydrostatic-fused "Upkeep" mine.
"Tallboy"	Very strong or durable structures (e.g.: submarine pens); battleship Tirpitz	1 x 12,000 lb (5,400 kg) short-delay fused "Tallboy" bomb.
"Grand Slam"	As well as direct hits on very strong or durable targets (such as submarine pens) it could be used indirectly to create a camouflet (cavern) that undermined structures such as bridges, viaducts and bunkers causing them to collapse.	1 x 22,000 lb (10,000 kg) short-delay fused "Grand Slam" bomb.

===== Bombsights =====
Bombsights used on Lancasters included:

Mark IX Course Setting Bomb Sight (CSBS).
This was an early preset vector bombsight that involved squinting through wires that had to be manually set based on aircraft speed, altitude and bombload. This sight lacked tactical flexibility as it had to be manually adjusted if any of the parameters changed and was soon changed in favour of more advanced designs.
Mark XIV bombsight
A vector bombsight where the bomb aimer input details of the bombload, target altitude and wind direction and the analogue computer then continuously calculated the trajectory of the bombs and projected an inverted sword shape onto a sighting glass on the sighting head. Assuming the sight was set correctly when the target was in the crosshairs of the sword shape, the bomb aimer would be able to accurately release the bombs.
T1 bombsight
A Mark XIV bombsight modified for mass production and produced in the USA. Some of the pneumatic gyro drives on the Mk XIV sight were replaced with electronic gyros and other minor modifications were made.
Stabilizing Automatic Bomb Sight
Also known as "SABS", this was an advanced bombsight mainly used by 617 Squadron for precision raids. Like the American Norden bombsight it was a tachometric sight.

=== Radio, radar and countermeasures equipment ===
The Lancaster had a very advanced communications system for its time. Most British-built Lancasters were fitted with the R1155 receiver and T1154 transmitter, whereas the Canadian-built aircraft and those built for service in the Far East had American radios. These provided radio direction-finding, as well as voice and Morse capabilities.

H2S
3 GHz frequency, ground-looking navigation radar system – eventually, it could be homed in on by the German night fighters' FuG 350 Naxos receiver and had to be used with discretion – a problem which the higher resolution, 10 GHz frequency American H2X radar never had to deal with. This is the large blister under the rear fuselage on later Lancasters.
Fishpond
An add-on to H2S that provided additional (aerial) coverage of the underside of the aircraft to display attacking fighters on an auxiliary screen in the radio operator's position.
Monica
A rearward-looking radar to warn of night fighter approaches. However, it could not distinguish between attacking enemy fighters and nearby friendly bombers and served as a homing beacon for suitably equipped German night fighters. Once this was realised after mid-July 1944, it was removed altogether.
GEE
A receiver for a navigation system of synchronised pulses transmitted from the UK – aircraft calculated their position from the time delay between pulses. The range of GEE was 300–400 mi (480–640 km). GEE used a whip aerial mounted on the top of the fuselage ahead of the mid-upper turret.
Boozer (radar detector)
A system of lights mounted on the aircraft's instrument panel that lit up when the aircraft was being tracked by the low-UHF band Würzburg-Riese ground radar and early model Lichtenstein B/C and C-1 airborne radar. In practice, it was found to be more disconcerting than useful, as the lights were often triggered by false alerts in the radar-signal-infested skies over Germany.
Oboe
A very accurate navigation system consisting of a receiver/transponder for two radar stations transmitting from widely separated locations in Southern England which, when used together, determined the aircraft's position. The system could handle only one aircraft at a time, and was fitted to a Pathfinder aircraft, usually a fast and manoeuvrable Mosquito which marked the target for the main force rather than a Lancaster.
GEE-H
Similar to Oboe but with the transponder on the ground allowing more aircraft to use the system simultaneously. GEE-H aircraft were usually marked with two horizontal yellow stripes on the fins.
"Village Inn" Automatic Gun-Laying Turret
A radar-aimed and ranged gun turret fitted to some Lancaster rear turrets in 1944. Identifiable by a radome mounted below the turret.
Airborne Cigar (ABC)
This was fitted only to the Lancasters of 101 Squadron. It had three 7-foot (2.1 m) aerials, two on the top of the fuselage and one under the bomb aimer's position. These aircraft carried a German-speaking crew member and were used to jam ground-to-air communications to German night fighters. The extra equipment and extra crewman added around 600 pounds (272 kg) to the bomber's weight so the bomb load was reduced by 1,000 pounds (454 kg). Due to the nature of the equipment, the enemy was able to track the aircraft and 101 Squadron suffered the highest casualty rate of any squadron. Fitted from about mid-1943, they remained until the end of the war.
Tinsel
A microphone installed in the nacelle of one of the engines that allowed the wireless operator to transmit engine noise on the German night fighter control voice frequencies.

== Operational history ==
=== Second World War ===
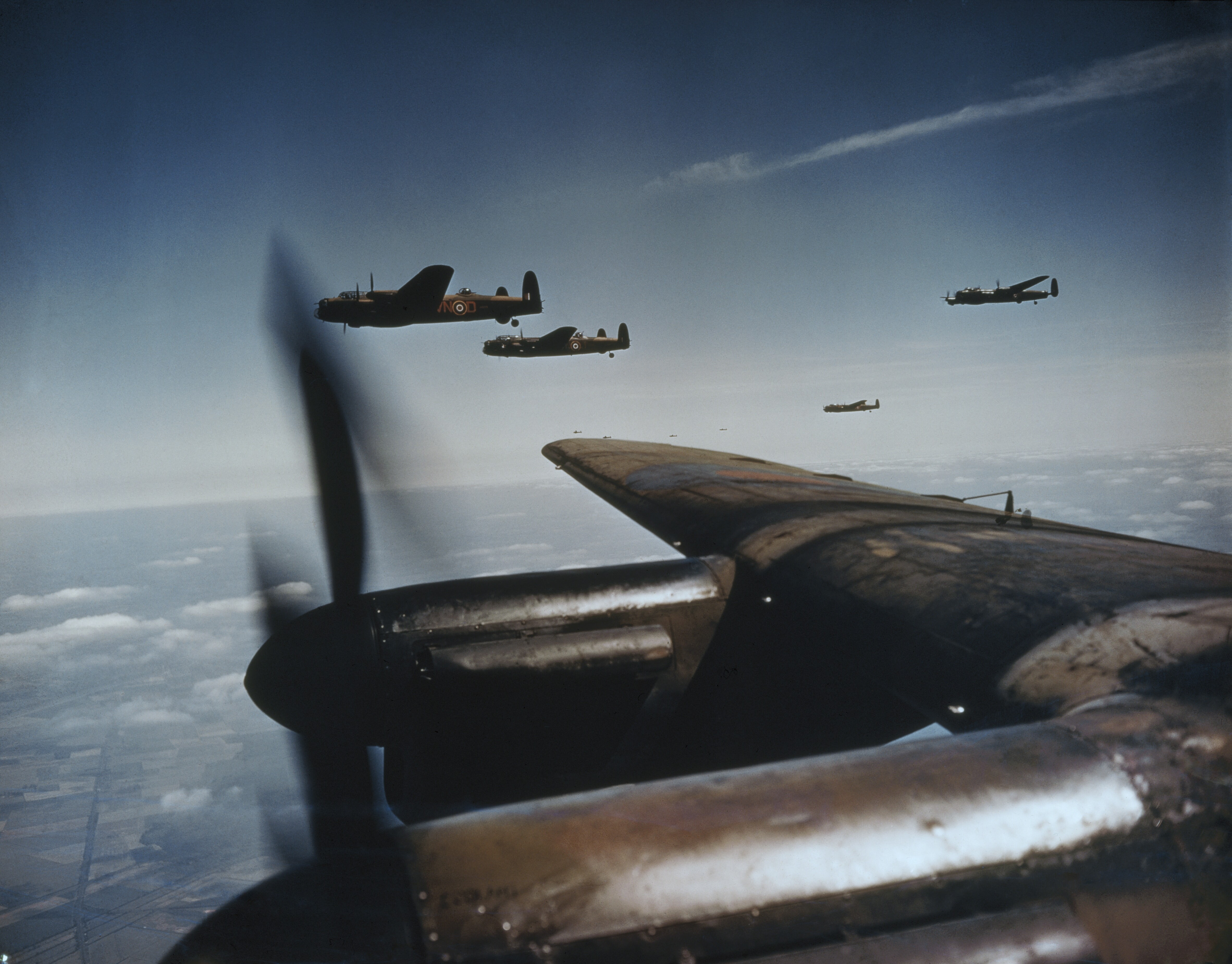
Lancasters of No. 50 Squadron fitted with exhaust shrouds intended to conceal exhaust flames from night fighters

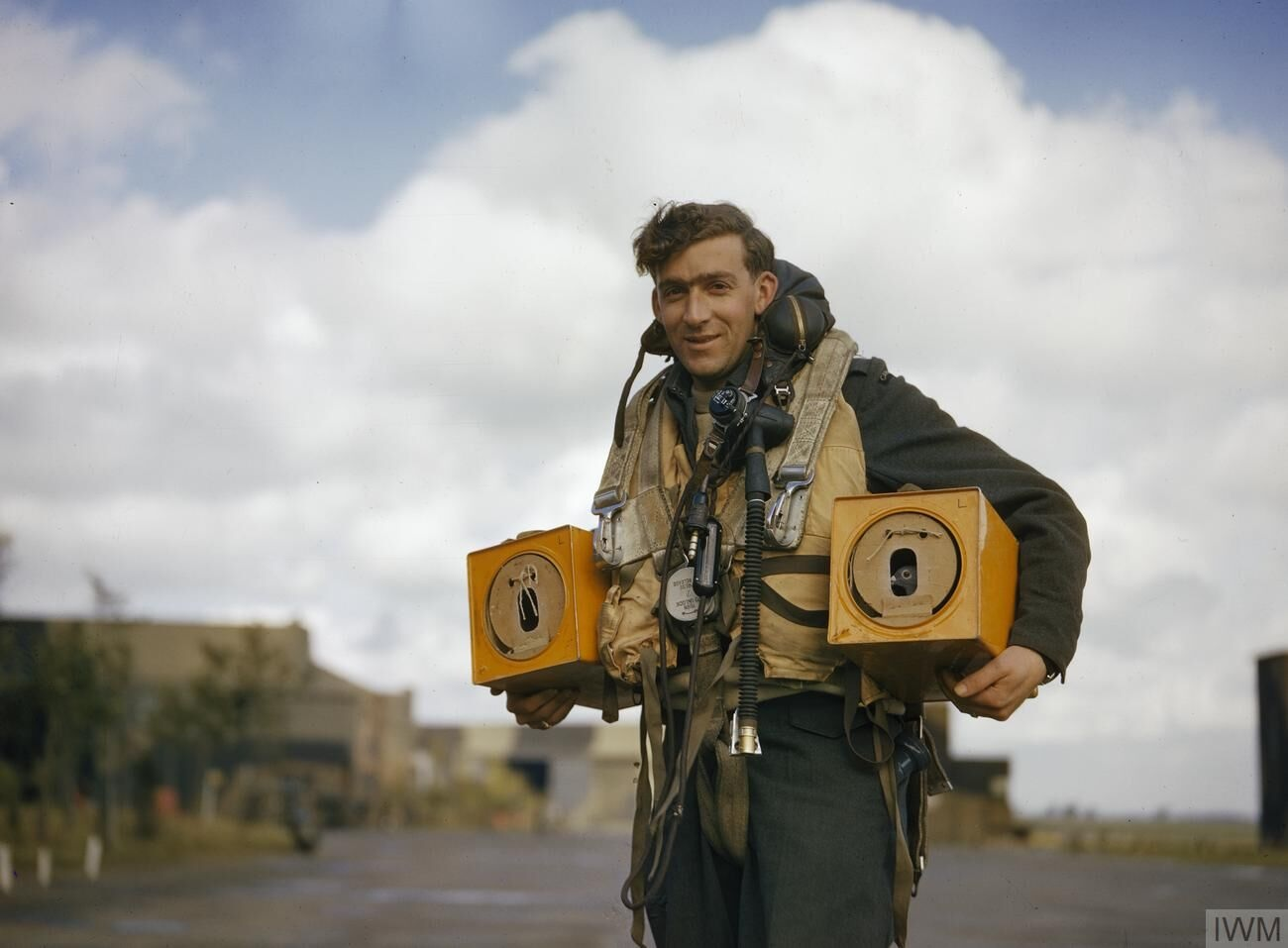
Crewman with homing pigeons, 1942. Pigeons were customarily carried aboard Lancasters as a means of communications in the event of a crash, ditching or radio failure.

During early 1942, No. 44 Squadron, based at RAF Waddington, Lincolnshire, became the first RAF squadron to convert to the Lancaster; it was quickly followed by No. 97 Squadron, which was also based at Waddington. On 2 March 1942, the first operational mission of the Lancaster, deploying naval mines in the vicinity of Heligoland Bight, was performed by aircraft of No. 44 Sqn; a planned mission against the German battleship Tirpitz had been rescheduled due to poor weather conditions. On 10 March 1942, the type's first bombing mission was conducted over the German city of Essen, North Rhine-Westphalia.

All Lancasters were temporarily grounded after a crash on 20 March in Boston, Lincolnshire; this was lifted after each aircraft had been inspected for signs of buckling on the upper wing surface. The first recorded casualties amongst Lancaster crews were recorded on 24 March 1942 with the loss of R5493 to anti-aircraft fire over Lorient. Due to the high loss rates typically involved in such operations, daytime bombing missions were performed sparingly until the Allies had achieved a level of aerial supremacy over the Axis powers.

On 17 April 1942, 12 Lancasters of No. 44 and No. 97 Squadrons undertook a bombing raid on the Maschinenfabrik Augsburg-Nürnberg A.G., Augsburg engine manufacturing plant in Southern Germany; despite flying at low altitude, three bombers were shot down by Luftwaffe Bf 109s over France, and at least two more were lost to anti-aircraft fire at the factory itself. Nonetheless, the factory was successfully bombed, a feat that was personally hailed by Prime Minister Winston Churchill in the aftermath. The attack revealed the existence of the Lancaster to both Germany and the British public alike. On 27 April, an unsuccessful small-scale attack on the Tirpitz was performed by Lancasters of both No. 44 and No. 97 Squadrons.

On the night of 30/31 May 1942, the Lancaster participated in Operation Millennium, the first 1,000 bomber raid against the German city of Cologne. By this point, the number of Lancasters in operational service had surpassed those of the preceding Manchester. On 12 June, the first use of the type by RAF Coastal Command, having loaned aircraft from RAF Bomber Command, commenced; it was used to conduct long range anti-U-boat operations, reportedly attacking two on 15 June.

Additional large-scale raids were performed against Emden between 19 and 23 June, and against Bremen between 25 and 29 June, the latter reportedly dealing considerable damage to the Focke-Wulf aircraft works. 40 Lancasters also flew an ineffective long-range raid upon Danzig, arriving after dusk and thus unable to effectively bomb its port to disrupt U-boat construction. On 31 July, 20% of Bomber Command's strength was directed against Düsseldorf, focused on Schiess A.G.'s machine tool manufacturing plant. The tempo of Lancaster operations rose to a new height in August 1942, major raids were flown against targets in the Ruhr, Duisburg, and in the Baltic Sea. An emphasis was placed upon aiding the Battle of the Atlantic by hindering the German Navy. Often, when the weather was deemed to be unsuitable for bombing missions, night-time mine-laying operations were flown instead.

A major improvement to night-time bombing came with the implementation of the Pathfinder Force (PFF) in August 1942; multiple squadrons were transferred from Bomber Command groups to constitute the new unit. These pathfinders were tasked with flying ahead of bomber formations to locate and mark targets using Target indicator flares to improve the accuracy of strikes by the following aircraft. Early PFF operations produced mixed results, but did prove decisive on 27/28 August against Kassel and the three factories of the Henschel aircraft company in the city. That same night, 12 Lancasters of No. 106 Squadron flew to Gdynia, armed with newly developed anti-capital ship bombs, intending to hit the battleships Scharnhorst and Gneisenau, as well as the aircraft carrier Graf Zeppelin, but did not manage to hit any ships due to a persistent haze.

While the Lancaster had been designed to conduct night-time operations, daylight raids were occasionally performed by the type as well. Occasionally, lone Lancasters would be dispatched to perform decoy raids on key manufacturing sites, such as munitions factories, with the intention of being spotted to cause workers to go to air raid shelters, thus disrupting production. On 17 October 1942, an audacious daytime raid was performed by 90 Lancasters of No. 5 Group, the bombing of the Schneider Works at Le Creusot, France; only a single aircraft, W4774, was lost during the course of the mission. Losses were avoided by measures such as flying beneath German radar cover, aerial reconnaissance along the intended route, and the strict observation of secrecy.

In late October 1942, the first Lancaster bombing missions over Italy were performed; on 22 and 23, the cities of Genoa and Turin were struck at night-time. On 24 October, the Italian city of Milan was raided by roughly 60 Lancasters during the daytime; railway infrastructure was a priority target for these attacks. These bombers had been escorted across the Channel by Spitfires before breaking formation to individually fly at low altitude to reach and fly over the Alps; a total of three were reportedly shot down by enemy fighters. During November, targets in Italy and Germany were alternatively attacked by Lancasters, striking the city of Osnabrück multiple times, conducting a heavy raid against Turin, and destroying supplies for the Afrika Korps in Genoa. Only eight bombing missions were conducted during all of December, the most prominent of which being against Duisburg, due to poor prevailing weather conditions.

Throughout 1942, the Lancaster remained in relatively short supply; consequently, both training and crew conversion courses typically had to be performed by the squadrons themselves; there were no aircraft furnished with dual controls at this time, and pilots would therefore have to perform their first flight without their instructors being capable of directly acting on the controls themselves. Furthermore, each Lancaster had its own ground crew early on; centralised servicing was introduced later. By the end of the year, a total of 16 operational squadrons had been stood up while around 200 Lancasters were under Bomber Command.

On 16 January 1943, the German capital city of Berlin was raided for the first time in over a year; conducted by an all-Lancaster force, the Berlin raid was fairly inconsequential beyond its psychological impact, not causing meaningful damage to either side. The first radial engined Lancasters were also introduced to service during January, alongside some new bombing aids. On 4 February, 198 Lancasters raided the city of Turin; days later, 466 Lancasters attacked Lorient, and an all-Lancaster force of 142 aircraft attacked Milan on 14 February. On 28 February, 86 Lancasters attacked the occupied French city of Saint-Nazaire; the next day, 79 Lancasters bombed Berlin. On 5 March, the Battle of the Ruhr strategic bombing campaign was launched by Bomber Command. The initial attack on Essen comprised 412 bombers, 140 of which were Lancasters. To cope with the higher attrition rate from these operations, a three-fold increase in production was enacted.

On 15 April, Stuttgart was raided by a large force of Lancasters; on the following day, Plzeň was similarly struck, although much of the intended attack upon the Škoda Works was unintentionally directed towards a large asylum instead; other targets that month included Stettin, Duisburg, and the Ruhr. The majority of strategic bombing missions flown during May were also directed towards the Ruhr region.

Perhaps the most famous single mission performed by the Lancaster was flown on 16–17 May 1943, codenamed Operation Chastise, to destroy the dams of the Ruhr Valley. The operation was carried out by No. 617 Squadron, which had been formed less than two months prior. They flew modified Lancaster Mk IIIs that were armed with special drum-shaped bouncing bombs; these had been specially designed by the British engineer Barnes Wallis; the Lancaster was the only bomber at the time capable of bearing the weapon. A total of 19 aircraft were dispatched on the operation, setting off in the evening and flying at very low altitudes most of the way to avoid detection. Initial attacks targeted the Mohne Dam until it was breached, then moved on to the Eder Dam, and then the Sorpe Dam and Ennepe Dam. The story of the operation was later made into a book, and subsequently a film, The Dam Busters.

The Ruhr continued to be intensely raided by Bomber Command for months following Operation Chastise with the aim of suppressing the region's industrial output. In June, Lancasters began operating in North Africa using the tactic of shuttle bombing from airfields in Blida and Maison Blanche. This was a key element of Operation Bellicose, the bombing of a German radar factory in the former Zeppelin Works at Friedrichshafen and the Italian naval base at La Spezia. On 12 July, an all-Lancaster force performed the biggest-yet bombing raid on Turin in support of the recently launched Italian Campaign. Further missions across the country were flown throughout this month, often focusing on electrical and railway infrastructure.

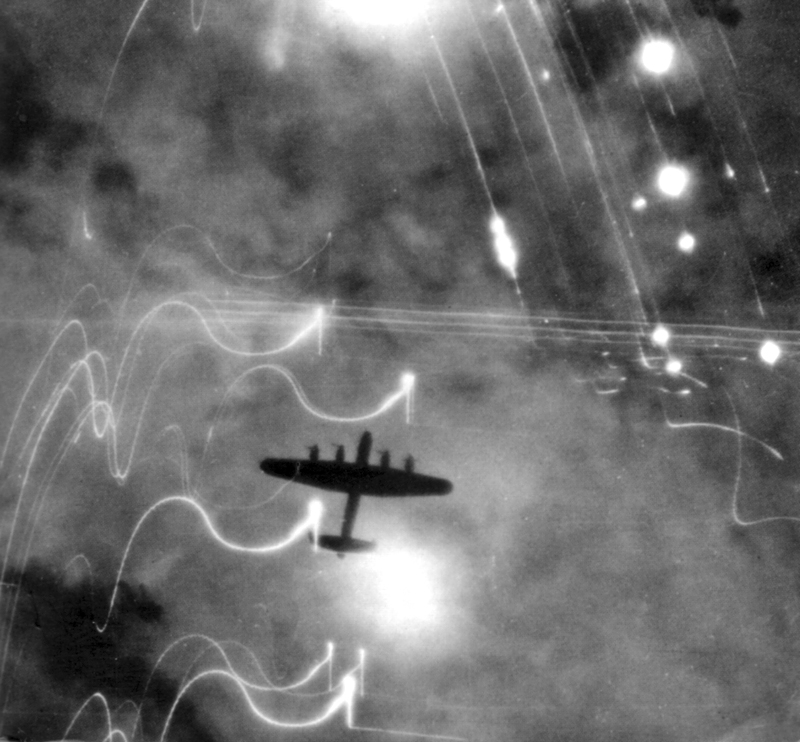
A Lancaster over Hamburg, circa 1943

During late July and early August 1943, large numbers of Lancasters participated in the devastating round-the-clock raids on the city of Hamburg during Air Chief Marshal Harris's Operation Gomorrah. On the night of 27 July, 787 RAF aircraft, comprising 74 Vickers Wellingtons, 116 Short Stirlings, 244 Handley Page Halifaxes and 353 Avro Lancasters, bombed the city. An estimated 18,474 people died on this night alone, despite many of victims being within air raid shelters and cellars, as the widespread fires across the city led to carbon monoxide poisoning. Altogether, 8,621 tons of bombs were dropped on Hamburg by the end of the operation.

On the night of 17/18 August, Operation Hydra was conducted against the Peenemünde Army Research Center, the site of the V-2 rocket and other German guided missiles and munitions; 17 Lancasters were lost in the costly but successful attack, mainly to German night fighters. Five days later, Lancasters struck numerous chemical works across Germany, including those in Leverkusen and Düsseldorf. On 23 August, a major raid on Berlin was conducted, dropping roughly 1,700 tons of bombs on the city; German night fighters responded, causing a 5.4% loss rate amongst Lancasters, while the Halifax and Stirling bombers suffered 8.8% and 12.9% loss rates respectively. Numerous strikes on the German capital occurred over the following weeks, sometimes by an all-Lancaster force.

In September, Hanover was subjected to the most concentrated bombing raid of the war so far. In October, the widespread bombing of numerous German cities took place, targeting Munich, Kassel, Frankfurt, Offenbach, Ludwigshafen, Stuttgart, Friedrichshafen, and Leipzig, along with other targets. By this point, the Royal Canadian Air Force had stood up its own operational squadrons equipped with Lancasters, and proceeded with offensive action over Germany in this same month.

In late 1943, Air Chief Marshal Harris advocated to Churchill for the persistent bombing of Berlin in preference to earlier targets such as the Ruhr. Between 15 November 1943 and 24 November 1944, sixteen major bombing operations were conducted against the German capital in the Battle of Berlin; of the 9,111 sorties flown, 7,256 had been performed by Lancasters. These raids, while often incurring in costly losses, were typically deemed to have been 'most satisfactory' by senior officials. In March 1944, the Berlin raids were somewhat lessened as a compromise, Bomber Command having been directed to destroy enemy communications and other targets around France and the Low Countries ahead of the Normandy landings on D-Day.

During April 1944, key targets in France included railway hubs in Villeneuve, Rouen, and Juvisy-sur-Orge. Special operations were flown against specific ammunition depots, munitions factories, and coastal batteries in advance of the Allied invasion. Around this time, Lancasters would also provide direct support to the local operations of field forces. By May, Bomber Command had a daily average operating strength of roughly 1,100 aircraft, 616 of which were Lancasters, 354 were Halifaxes, 72 Mosquitos, and 58 Stirlings; between 300 and 400 bombers were being deployed every night, dependent on weather conditions. In May and June, extensive operations were flown against the fortifications of the Atlantic Wall. The first combat use of Barnes Wallis' 12,000 lb (5,400 kg) 'Tallboy' bombs occurred around this time.

On 14 June, the first large-scale daylight bombing raid since 1942 was conducted using Lancasters against enemy shipping at the harbours of Le Havre and Boulogne. These daylight raids quickly became frequent as, due to a shortage of oil, the Luftwaffe were increasingly incapable of mounting opposition; to further this difficulty for their opponent, Lancasters were directed against numerous oil installations. In conjunction, low-level nighttime bombing raids continued, but the emphasis shifted away from the strategic bombing of German industry in favour of directly attacking military concentrations, such as U-boat pens and V-1 flying bomb launch sites.

During July, in the days following the Normandy landings, Lancasters heavily bombed the city of Caen repeatedly. On 24 August, eight Tallboys were dropped in a daylight attack on the U-boat pens at IJmuiden, two direct hits were recorded. Multiple raids on V-1 launch sites and enemy shipping were also performed during August; the partially constructed battleship Clemenceau was one of the targets that were struck around this time. September saw a heavy focus on airfields in Holland, as well as repeated raids on German-held Le Havre and oil targets in the Ruhr. On 17 September, precision strikes were performed on Boulogne only 200 yards from the Allied lines.

In October, Lancasters repeatedly struck the sea wall at Westkapelle, seeing to prevent the Germans from intentionally flooding neighbouring lands to delay Allied ground forces. Extensive daylight raids were performed during the month; cities such as Cologne, Walcheren, and Bergen were targeted by hundreds of Lancasters. Bomber operations proceeded in both day and nighttime against industrial towns, airfields, communications, and troop concentrations into December; one such operation was flown against the E-boat pens at Rotterdam on 29 December.

Throughout the latter half of 1944, a series of high-profile bombing missions were performed by the Lancaster against the German battleship Tirpitz. Executed by Nos. 617 and 9 Sqns, a combination of Lancaster B.I and B.III bombers were armed with Tallboy bombs and were adapted with enlarged bomb bay doors to accommodate their special payloads and additional fuel tanks to provide the necessary endurance. A total of three attacks, individually codenamed Operation Paravane, Operation Obviate and Operation Catechism, were conducted against Tirpitz, which was anchored in a fjord in Occupied Norway. The first of these attacks disabled the vessel while the third mission was responsible for sinking the ship. Due to actions such as Operation Chastise and the sinking of Tirpitz, No. 617 Sqn was perhaps the most famous of all Lancaster squadrons.

On 1 January 1945, the Dortmund–Ems Canal was attacked by Lancasters, hitting it at a vulnerable section near Ladbergen. An attack on Pforzheim on 23 February was described by aviation author Bruce Robertson as amongst the most concentrated and successful flown in the conflict. In the final months of the war, Lancasters were encountering the newly developed Messerschmitt Me 262, the first German jet-powered fighter aircraft, sometimes flying in formations of up to 40 aircraft. On 4 November 1944, a Lancaster of 428 squadron was attacked by a Me 262, which was shot down by the rear gunner Ben Rakus. The pilot F.W. Walker noted that this was the first instance of a heavy bomber shooting down a jet.

During early 1945, a total of 33 Lancaster B.Is were modified so that they could deploy the 22,000 lb (10,000 kg) Grand Slam bomb, the heaviest conventional bomb to be used during the conflict. On 13 March 1945, the first operational use of the Grand Slam was performed by a Lancaster of No. 617 Sqn against the Bielefeld viaduct in North Rhine-Westphalia; this target had not yet been rendered inoperable despite being damaged by prior conventional bombing. The Tallboy strike successfully destroyed roughly 100 yards of the viaduct's length; additional viaducts, such as at Arnsberg, were promptly targeted by the squadron thereafter.

By April 1945, there were in excess of 1,000 Lancasters in frontline service, dwarfing the numbers of Halifaxes and Mosquitos (a light bomber) operated by Bomber Command at that time. Key industrial sites, such as the Auguste Viktoria benzol factory, were struck, while oil installations continued to be a prominent target of bombing raids in the hope of exacerbating the German fuel shortage. Amongst the final wartime operations performed by the Lancaster was the Bombing of Obersalzberg, aimed at the destruction of Eagle's Nest, the extensive holiday home complex used by German leader Adolf Hitler. Unusually, the BBC were permitted to announce the raid before it was completed.

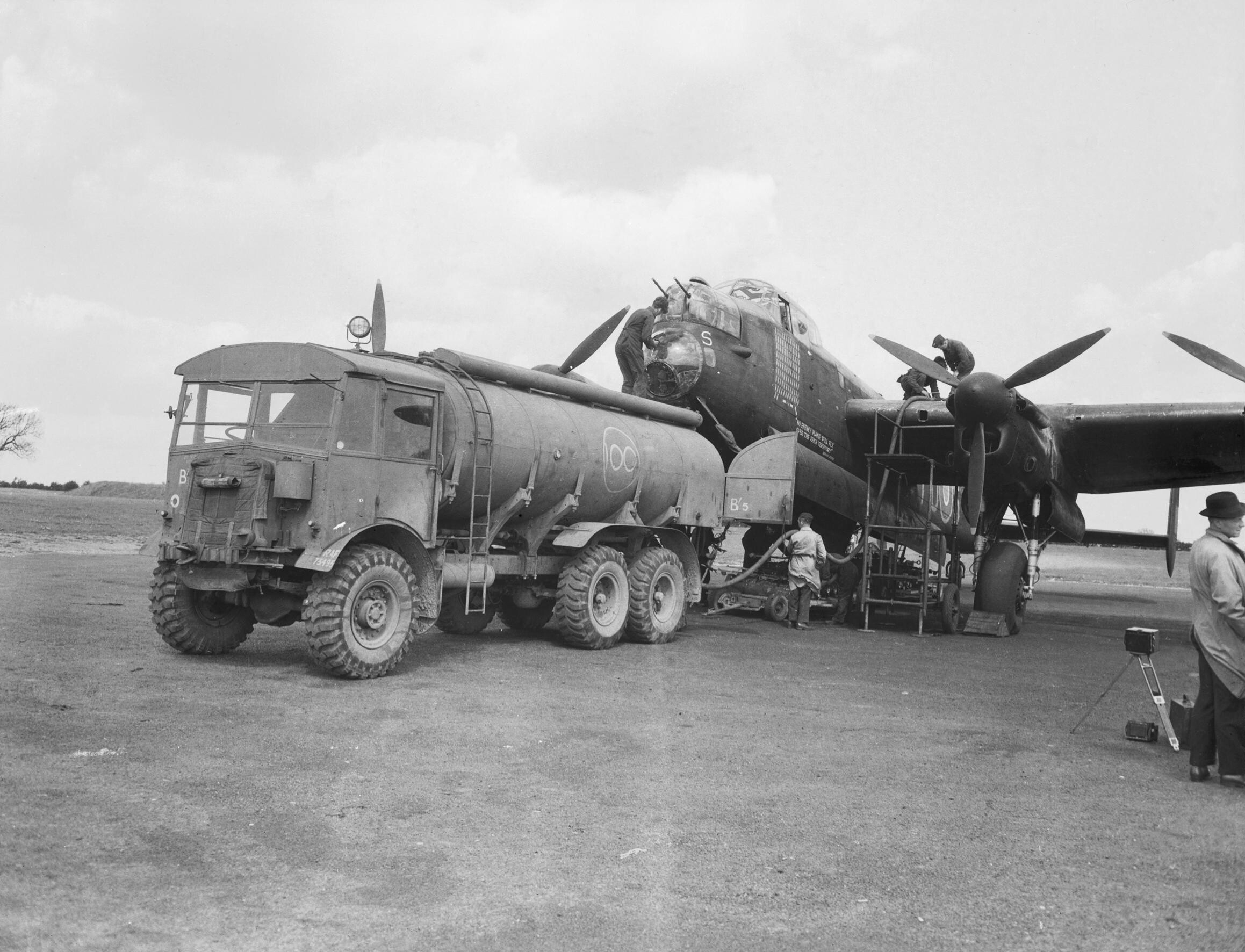
A Lancaster being fuelled from an AEC Matador truck, 1944

RAF Lancasters dropped food into the Holland region of the occupied Netherlands, with the acquiescence of the occupying German forces, to feed people who were in danger of starvation. The mission was named 'Operation Manna' after the food manna which is said to have miraculously appeared for the Israelites in the Book of Exodus. The aircraft involved were from 1, 3, and 8 Groups, and consisted of 145 Mosquitos and 3,156 Lancasters, flying between them a total of 3,298 sorties. The first of the two RAF Lancasters chosen for the test flight was nicknamed "Bad Penny" from the old expression: "a bad penny always turns up." This bomber, with a crew of seven men (five Canadians including pilot Robert Upcott of Windsor, Ontario), took off in bad weather on the morning of 29 April 1945 without a ceasefire agreement from the German forces, and successfully dropped its cargo.

==== Assessment ====
The Lancaster conducted a total of 156,000 sorties and dropped 608,612 long tons (618,378,000 kg) of bombs between 1942 and 1945. Only 35 Lancasters completed more than 100 successful operations each, and 3,249 were lost in action. The most successful survivor completed 139 operations and was ultimately retired from service and scrapped in 1947. From 1942 onwards, the Lancaster became the mainstay of the British heavy bomber fleet; by the end of the war in Europe, there were roughly 50 squadrons equipped with the Lancaster, the majority of these being the Lancaster B.I model. From its entry into service, the original model of the Lancaster was operated in almost every major bombing raid of the European conflict.

Adolf Galland (commander of the Luftwaffe fighters) considered the Lancaster to be "the best night bomber of the war", as did his adversary, Arthur "Bomber" Harris, who referred to it as Bomber Command's "shining sword". Goulding and Garbett wrote that: "The achievements of the Lancaster and the men who flew it have been widely acclaimed, and the aircraft has been described as the greatest single factor in winning WWII, an exaggeration but a pardonable one".

Lancasters from Bomber Command were to have formed the main strength of Tiger Force, the Commonwealth bomber contingent scheduled to take part in Operation Downfall, the codename for the planned invasion of Japan in late 1945. Aircraft allocated to the Tiger Force were painted in white with black undersides and outfitted with additional radio units and navigational aids to facilitate their use in the Pacific theatre. The addition of large saddle-type external fuel tanks was considered and trialled in Australia and India, but this was discontinued due to their perceived vulnerability to attack. Together with the new Avro Lincoln and Liberators, the bombers would have operated from bases on Okinawa; the envisioned invasion did not happen when such action was made unnecessary by the surrender of Japan.

While the Lancaster was briefly considered for carrying the atomic bomb as being one of the two Allied bombers capable of carrying the atomic bomb internally, after the Boeing B-29 Superfortress began to be modified in November 1943 for carrying the new bombs, the suggestion for using the Lancaster never came up again. Using the Lancaster would have required less modification to the aircraft itself, but would have necessitated additional crew training for the USAAF crews. In addition, the Lancaster had a lower ceiling and flew slower so was at risk of the bomb blast. It also had a shorter range. "The B-29 was, therefore, deemed the better bet if it could be modified in time.". Major General Leslie Groves, the director of the Manhattan Project, and General Henry H. Arnold, the Chief of United States Army Air Forces (USAAF), wished to use an American plane if this was at all possible. "Because the use of a British plane would have caused us many difficulties and delays"

As a byproduct of its sound design and operational success, various developments and derivatives of the Lancaster were produced for both military and civilian purposes. One of these was the Avro Lincoln bomber, initially designated Lancaster IV and Lancaster V which became the Lincoln B.1 and B.2 respectively. A civilian airliner was converted from the Lancaster with the addition of nose and tail fairings and seats, as the Lancastrian and a similar aircraft was derived from the Lincoln as the Lincolnian. Other developments included the York, a transport with a much larger square section fuselage, and via the Lincoln, the Shackleton maritime patrol aircraft which continued in RAF service in that role until replaced by the Hawker Siddeley Nimrod in the early 1970s, but saw further service as an airborne early warning (AEW) system until finally retired in 1991. The Tudor airliner also used the Lincoln wings, but with a new tubular fuselage.

=== After the war ===
==== Royal Air Force ====
The Lancaster remained in use for several years after the end of the war, during which a number of high-profile operations were conducted.

During the summer of 1946, No. 35 Squadron Lancasters toured the United States and were autographed by various American movie stars, and retained these until their retirements. A pair of Lancasters, PD328 and PB873, performed several long-distance flights, including round-the-world and trans-polar trips.

The Lancaster remained at the forefront of RAF Bomber Command while the Lancaster B.I was gradually replaced by the improved Lancaster B.I (F/E) and B.VII (F/E) models. During 1947–1948, No. 82 Squadron received new PR.1 dedicated photo-reconnaissance model derived from the Lancaster B.1 which was painted silver and lacked defensive turrets. These carried out aerial surveys of Central and East Africa and at least one was operated by the Ministry of Aviation. RAF Coastal Command received a small number of grey-painted Lancaster MR.1s, which were normally based at RAF Kinloss, Moray Firth.

The Lancaster continued to be operated in significant numbers until the introduction of the Avro Lincoln, a development of the Lancaster. The Lincoln was not available in quantity for several years following the end of the conflict, and it took until December 1953 for the final Bomber Command Lancaster to be retired. The last Lancaster in active service with the RAF, a reconnaissance aircraft, is believed to have been retired in late 1954.

==== French Aéronavale ====
Avro overhauled 59 Lancaster B.Is and B.VIIs at Woodford and Langar which were delivered to the French Aéronavale during 1952/53, which were flown until the mid-1960s by four squadrons stationed in France and New Caledonia in the maritime reconnaissance and search-and-rescue roles.

==== Argentine Air Force ====
Between 1948 and 1949, 15 former RAF Lancasters were overhauled at Langar for use by the Argentine Air Force. During its Argentine service, Lancasters were used offensively in suppressing and supporting military coups.

==== Royal Canadian Air Force ====
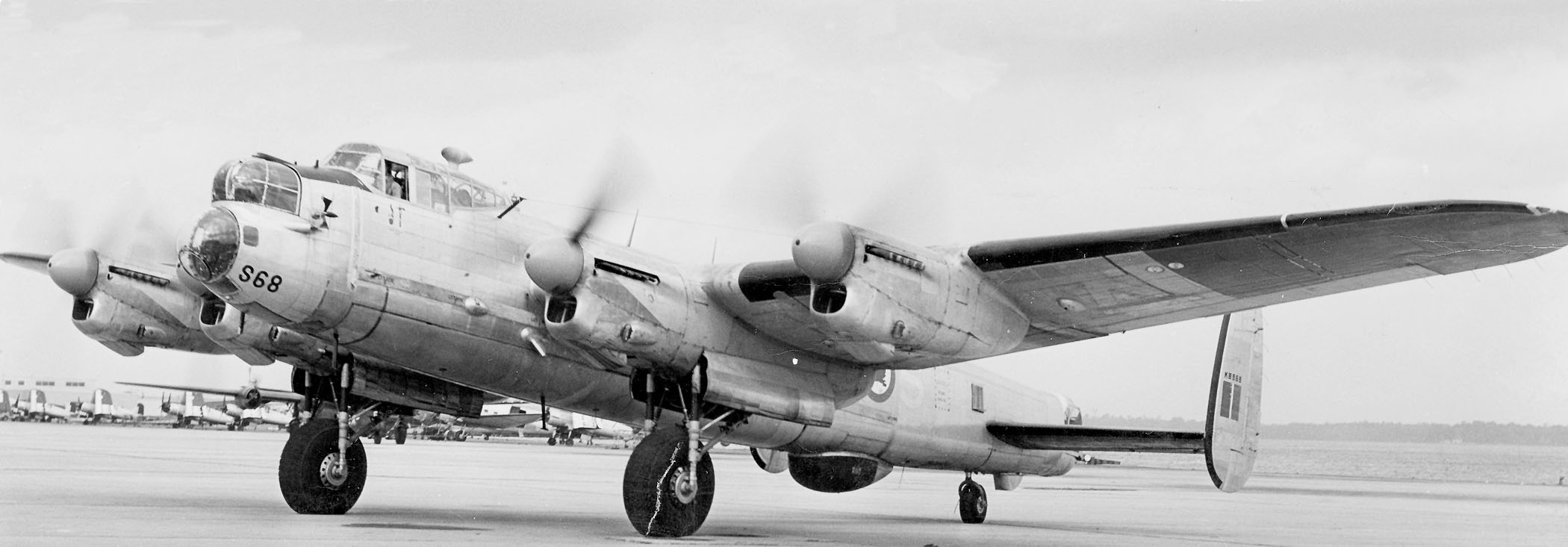
RCAF 405 Squadron Lancaster 10MP Maritime Patrol aircraft in February 1953

Beginning in 1946, Lancaster Mk Xs were modified for service with the Royal Canadian Air Force (RCAF). Fourteen were modified to perform aerial and photo-reconnaissance missions; these would go on to perform much of the mapping of northern Canada until as late as 1962. Throughout the 1950s, the RCAF operated seventy modified Lancasters, designated Lancaster 10MR/MPs, as Maritime Reconnaissance and Patrol aircraft in an anti-submarine role. Modifications involved the installation of radar and sonobuoy operators' positions, removal of the rear and mid-upper gun turrets, installation of a 400-gallon fuel tank in the bomb bay to increase the patrol range, upgraded electronics, radar, and instrumentation, and a cooking stove in the centre section. They served throughout the 1950s, when they were supplemented by the Lockheed Neptune and finally replaced by the Canadair Argus.

==== Transport ====
Immediately following the end of hostilities, the Lancaster was used without any major modifications as a transport aircraft, being used to ferry thousands of prisoners of war (POWs) back to the British Isles from across the continent. Repatriation flights returning POWs and ordinary troops continued until November 1945.

Civil conversions of the type continued during the initial postwar years. In 1946, four Lancasters were converted by Avro at Bracebridge Heath, Lincolnshire as freighters for use by British South American Airways, but proved to be uneconomical, and were withdrawn after a year in service. In addition, four Lancaster IIIs were converted by Flight Refuelling Limited as two pairs of tanker and receiver aircraft for the development of in-flight refuelling. In 1947, one aircraft was flown non-stop 3,459 mi (5,567 km) from London to Bermuda. Later on, these two tanker aircraft were joined by another converted Lancaster; these saw use during the Berlin Airlift, achieving 757 tanker sorties.

From 1943 to 1947, the Canadian Government Trans-Atlantic Air Service (CGTAS) provided a trans-Atlantic military passenger and postal delivery service using a modified long-distance transport version of the Lancaster Mark X. Nine of these aircraft were produced, referred to as Lancaster XPPs (for Lancaster Mk.X Passenger Planes), and each was equipped with rudimentary passenger facilities. The inaugural flight from Dorval (Montreal) to Prestwick, Scotland on 22 July 1943, was completed non-stop in a record 12:26 hours; the average crossing time was about 13:25 hours. By the end of the war, these aircraft had completed hundreds of trips across the Atlantic. CGTAS ushered in the era of commercial air travel across the North Atlantic, and in 1947 the service became part of Trans-Canada Air Lines, which carried paying civilian passengers in the Lancaster XPPs until they were replaced by Douglas DC-4s in 1947.

== Variants ==
B.I
The original Lancasters were produced with Rolls-Royce Merlin XX engines and SU carburettors. Minor details were changed throughout the production series – for example, the pitot head design was changed from being on a long mast at the front of the nose to a short fairing mounted on the side of the fuselage under the cockpit. Later production Lancasters had Merlin 22 and 24 engines. No designation change was made to denote these alterations.

B.I Special

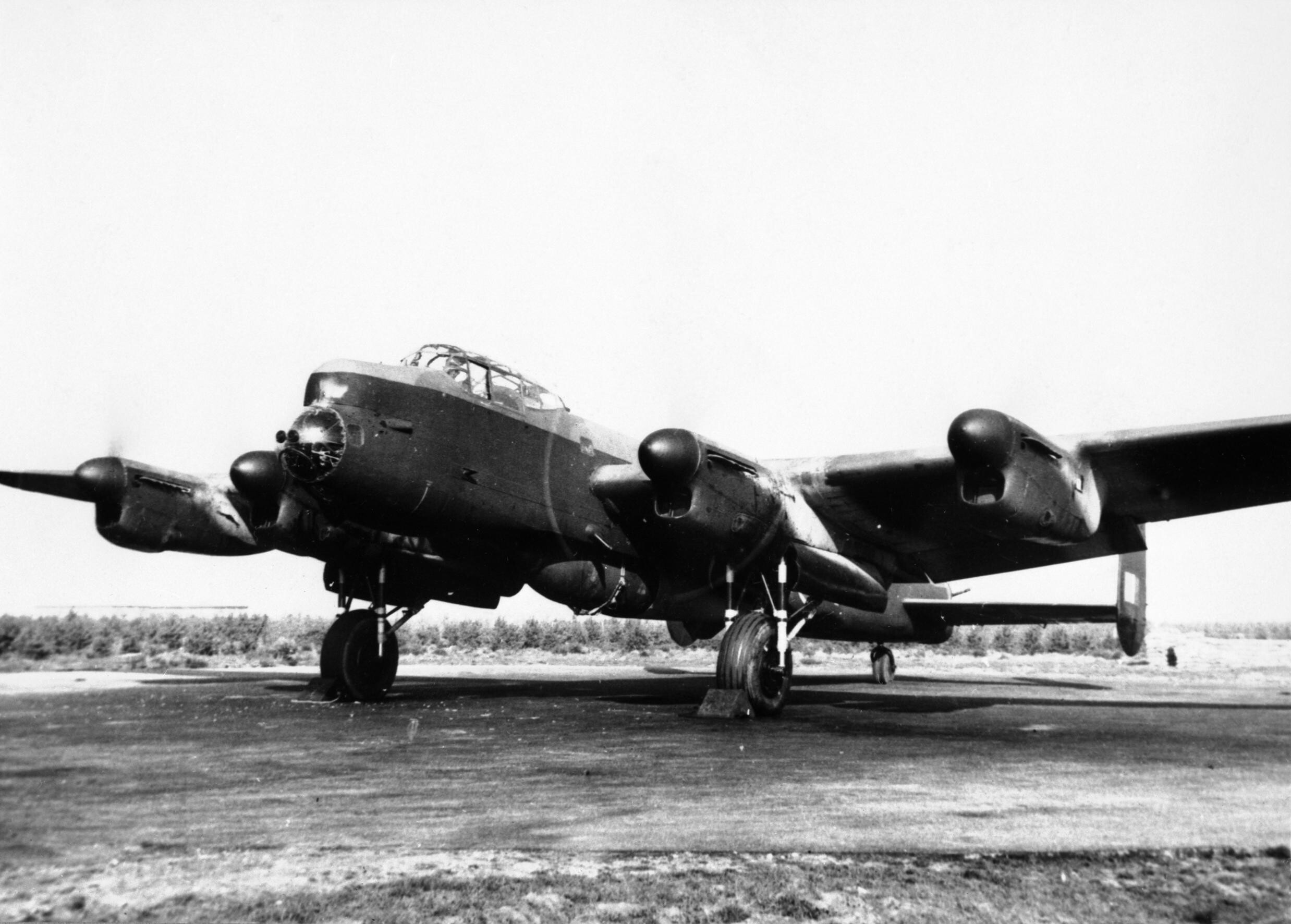
B.I Special loaded with a Grand Slam

32 Aircraft were adapted to take first the super-heavy "Tallboy" and then "Grand Slam" bombs. Up-rated engines with paddle-bladed propellers gave more power, and the removal of gun turrets reduced weight and gave smoother lines. For the Tallboy, the bomb bay doors were bulged; for the Grand Slam, they were removed completely and the area faired over. For some Tallboy raids, the mid-upper turret was removed. This modification was retained for the Grand Slam aircraft, and in addition, the nose turret was later removed. Two airframes (HK541 and SW244) were modified to carry a dorsal "saddle tank" with 1,200 imp gal (5,500 L; 1,400 US gal) mounted aft of a modified canopy for increasing range. No. 1577 SD Flight tested the aircraft in India and Australia in 1945 for possible use in the Pacific, but the tank adversely affected handling characteristics when full and an early type of in-flight refuelling designed in the late 1930s for commercial flying boats was later used instead.

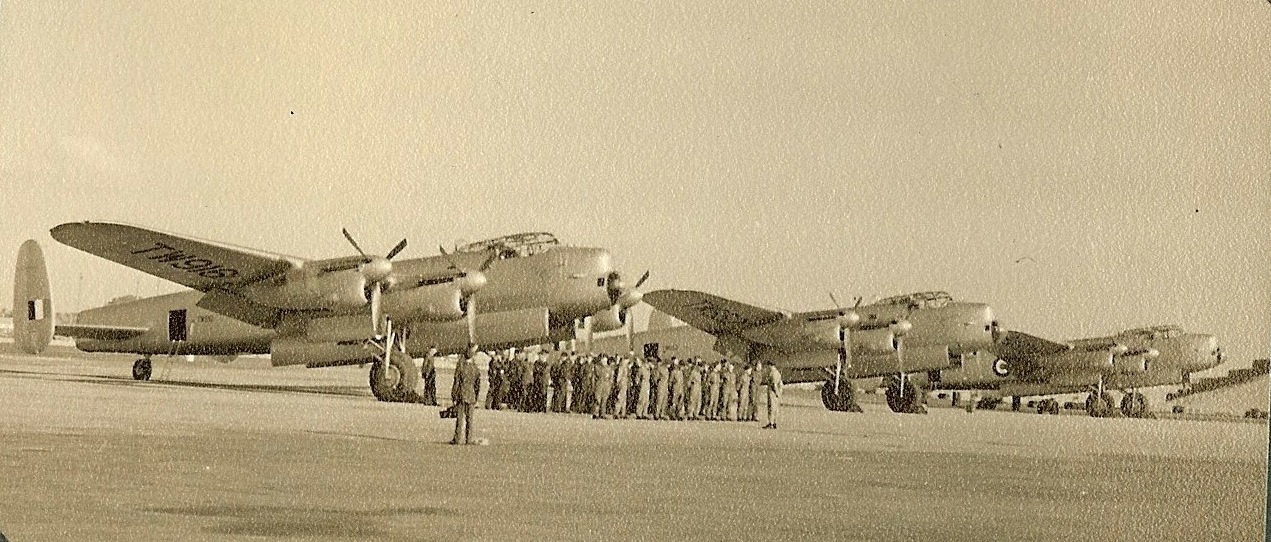
PR1. 683(PR) Squadron, RAF Fayid, Egypt, undertaking photographic reconnaissance and mapping activities

PR.1
B 1 modified for photographic reconnaissance, operated by RAF No. 82 and No. 541 Squadrons, wartime. All armament and turrets were removed with a reconfigured nose and a camera carried in the bomb bay. The type was also operated by 683(PR) Squadron when it was re-formed in November 1950 to undertake photographic reconnaissance and mapping activities, initially based at RAF Fayid, Egypt, before moving to RAF Kabrit in February 1951, and subsequently Habbaniya in Iraq until the squadron was disbanded on 30 November 1953.

B.I (FE)
In anticipation of the needs of the Tiger Force operations against the Japanese in the Far East (FE), a tropicalised variant was based on late production aircraft. The B.I (FE) had modified radio, radar, nav-aids, and a 400 imp gal (1,800 L; 480 US gal) tank installed in the bomb bay. Most were painted with white upper surfaces to reduce internal temperatures in the tropical sun, and black undersides with a low demarcation between the colours, completely omitting any red colours on the national insignia in all cases to avoid confusion with the hinomaru insignia of the Japanese.

B.II

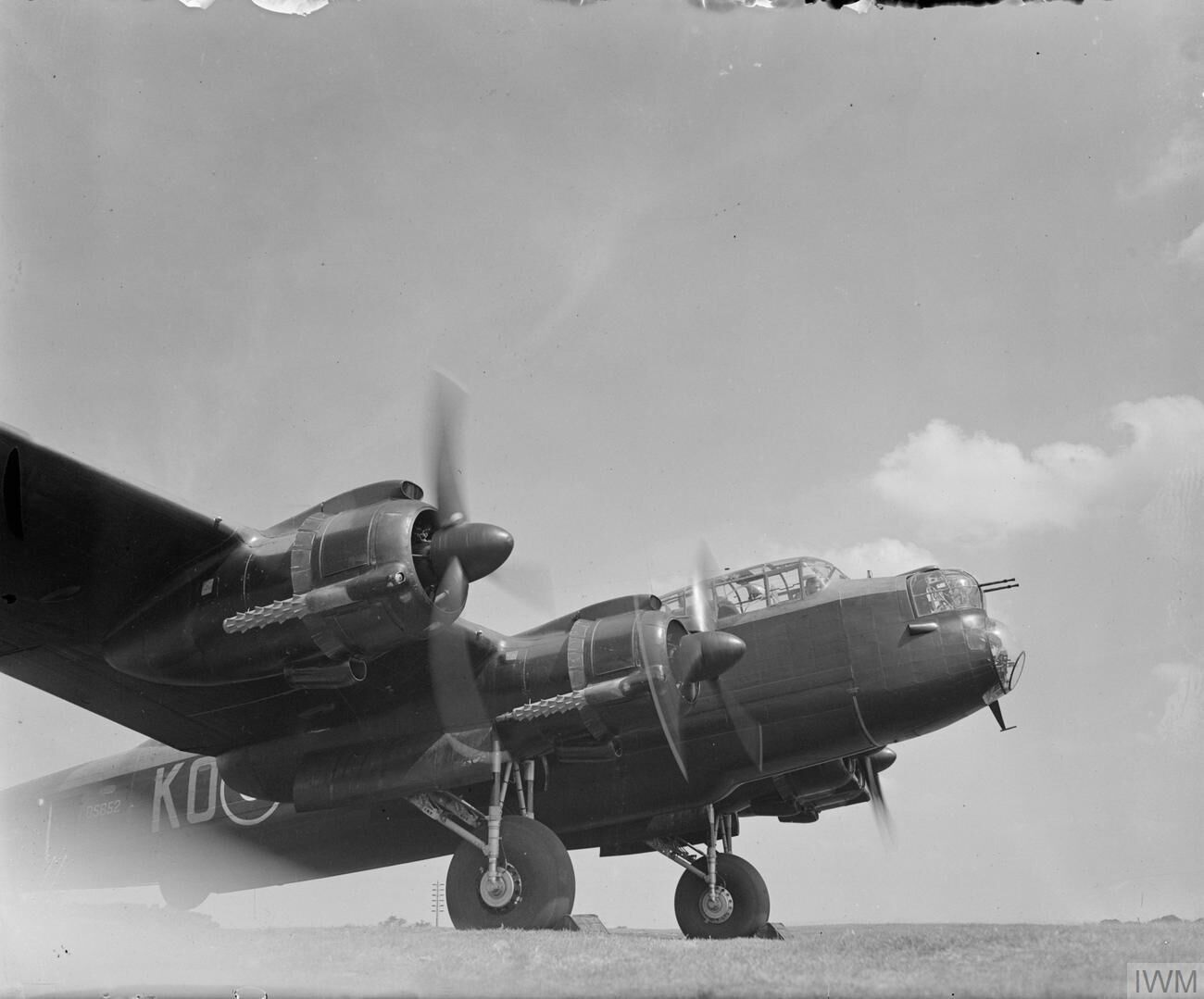
B.II with Bristol Hercules radial engines

Bristol Hercules (Hercules VI or XVI engines) powered variant, of which 300 were produced by Armstrong Whitworth. One difference between the two engine versions was that the VI had manual mixture control, requiring an extra lever on the throttle pedestal. Very early examples were fitted with an FN.64 ventral turret; however, these were quickly removed due to problems with aiming the turret through its periscope (which prevented the gunner from seeing a target he was not already aiming at), and inadequate traverse speed.

Due to the Luftwaffe Schräge Musik attacks, a variety of unofficial field modifications were made, including the fitting of 20 mm (0.79 in) cannon or a .50 in (13 mm) machine gun in the open hole where the FN.64 had been installed, before an official modification (Mod 925) fitted with a .303 in (7.7 mm) machine gun was authorised for the same location, though not used in all aircraft. These were rarely installed on other variants as the H2S radar was usually installed, however the B.II's bulged bomb bay interfered with its installation, leaving the opening free. Three types of bulged bomb bay were used on the B.II, the prototype having a narrow bulge running from just aft of the cockpit to the turret location, while early production examples had a full-width bulge that ran the same length and on late production examples, the bomb bay doors prominently bulged throughout their length.

B.III
This variant, which was built concurrently with the B.I and was indistinguishable externally from that variant, was fitted with Packard-built Merlin engines. The Packard Merlins used Bendix – Stromberg pressure-injection carburettors, requiring the addition of slow-running cut-off switches in the cockpit.

B.III (Special)

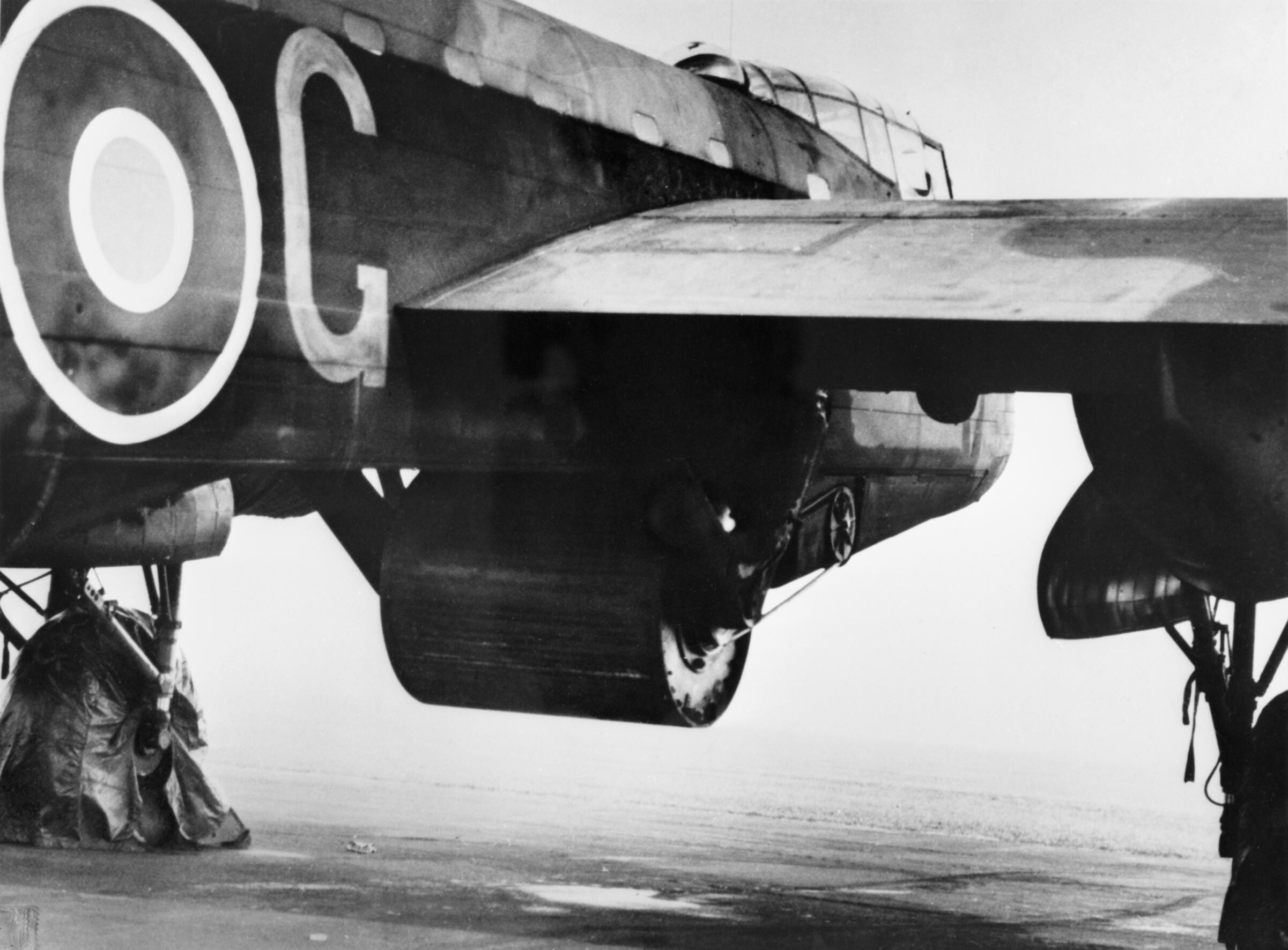
"Upkeep" bouncing bomb used for dam busting bomb mounted under Lancaster B.III (Special). The chain was driven by a hydraulic motor and gave the bomb its backspin.

Known at the time of modification as the "Type 464 Provisioning" Lancaster, 23 aircraft of this type were built to carry the "Upkeep" bouncing bomb for the dam busting raids. The bomb bay doors were removed and Vickers-built struts to carry the bomb were fitted in their place at Woodford Aerodrome near Stockport where the workers worked day and night. A hydraulic motor, driven by the pump previously used for the mid-upper turret was fitted to spin the bomb. Lamps were fitted in the bomb bay and nose for the simple height measurement system which enabled the accurate control of low-flying altitude at night. The mid-upper turret was removed to save weight and the gunner moved to the front turret to relieve the bomb aimer from having to man the front guns so that he could assist with map reading.

ASR.III/ASR.3
B.III modified for air-sea rescue, with three dipole ventral antennas fitted aft of the radome and carrying an airborne lifeboat in an adapted bomb bay. The armament was often removed and the mid-upper turret faired-over, especially in postwar use. Observation windows were added to both sides of the rear fuselage, a port window just forward of the tailplane and a starboard window into the rear access door. A number of ASR 3 conversions were fitted with Lincoln-style rudders.

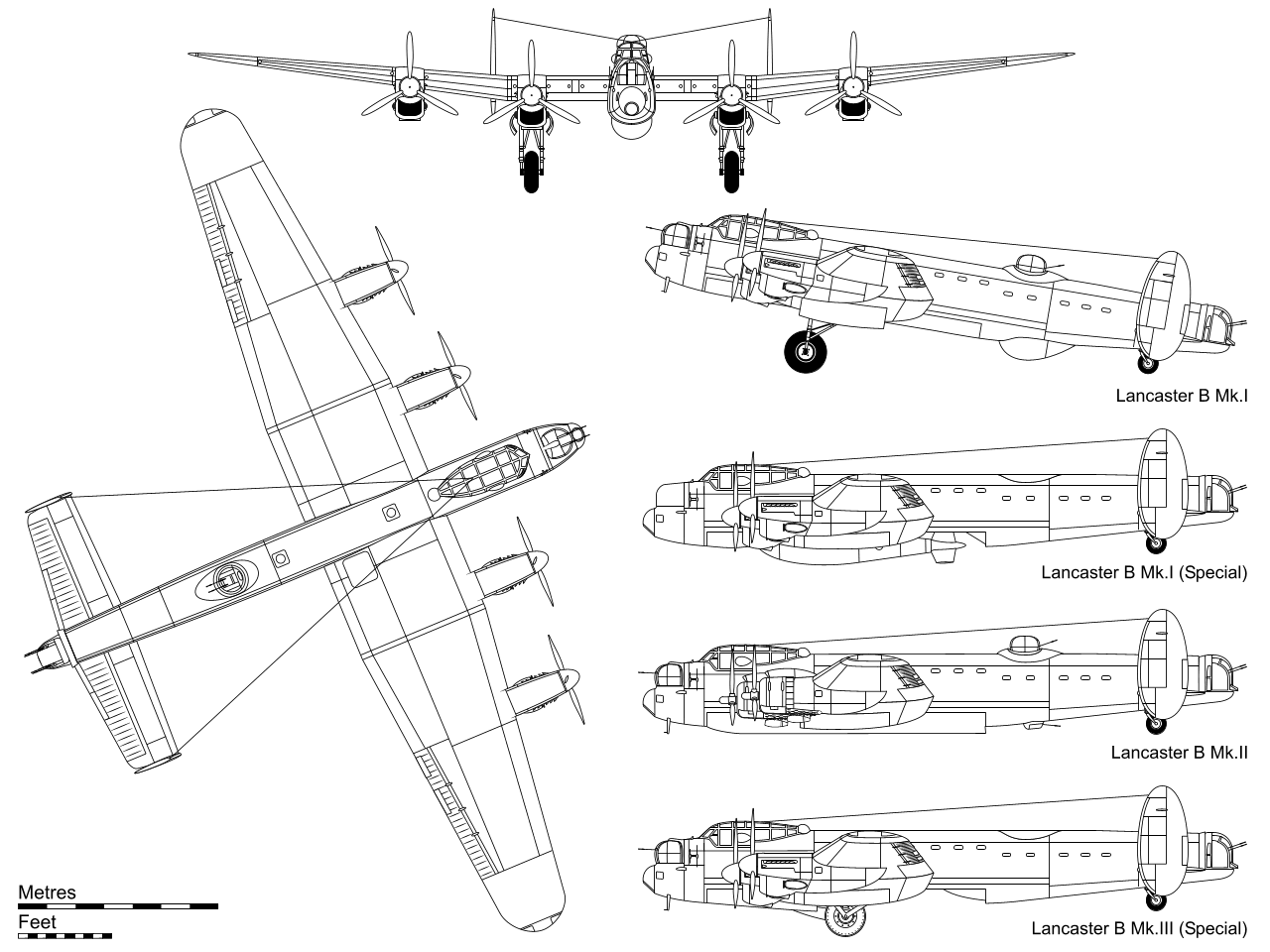
Lancaster B Mk.I drawing with extra side views for the B Mk.I (Special) with Grand Slam bomb, Hercules-powered B Mk.II with bulged bomb bay doors and FN.64 ventral turret and the B Mk.III (Special) with the Upkeep store

GR.3/MR.3
B.III modified for maritime reconnaissance.

B.IV
The B.IV featured an increased wingspan and lengthened fuselage and new Boulton Paul F turret (two X 0.5in Browning machine guns) with framed "bay window" nose glazing. The prototypes (PW925, PW929 and PW932) were powered by two-stage Merlin 85s inboard and later, Merlin 68s on the outboard mounts. Because of the major redesign, the aircraft was quickly renamed Lincoln B 1.

B.V
Increased wingspan and lengthened fuselage, two-stage Merlin 85s. Renamed Lincoln B 2.

B.VI
Nine aircraft converted from B.IIIs. Fitted with Merlin 85/87 which had two-stage superchargers, giving much improved high-altitude performance. The B VI could achieve a maximum speed of 313 mph (504 km/h) at 18,200 ft (5,500 m) at a 65,000 lb (29,000 kg) takeoff weight and a service ceiling of 28,500 ft (8,700 m) at the same weight. Climb to 28,000 ft (8,500 m) at 65,000 lb (29,000 kg) takeoff weight was accomplished in 44.8 minutes with a maximum climb rate of 1,080 ft/min (5.5 m/s) at 1,000 ft (300 m). A Lancaster B VI was dived to a maximum indicated speed of 350 mph (560 km/h), or Mach 0.72 at 25,000 ft (7,600 m) in June 1944. The Merlin 85/87 series engines were fitted with annular cowlings similar to the Avro Lincoln and three-bladed paddle-type propellers were fitted. These aircraft were used by only Pathfinder units; by No. 7 Squadron RAF, No. 83 Squadron RAF, No. 405 Squadron RCAF and by No. 635 Squadron RAF. Often used as a "Master Bomber" the B VIs were allocated to RAF Bomber Command apart from two that were retained by Rolls-Royce for installation and flight testing. Their dorsal and nose turrets were removed and faired over. The more powerful engines proved troublesome in service and were disliked by ground maintenance staff for their rough running and propensity to 'surge and hunt', making synchronisation impossible. This was caused by variations in the fuel/air mixture and over time would damage the engine. The B VI was withdrawn from operational service in November 1944 and surviving aircraft were used by Rolls-Royce, the Royal Aircraft Establishment and the Bomb Ballistics Unit (BBU) for various testing and experimental duties.

B.VII
The B.VII was the final production version of the Lancaster. The Martin 250CE mid-upper turret was moved slightly further forward than on previous Marks and the Nash & Thomson FN-82 tail turret with twin 0.50 in (12.7 mm) Browning machine guns replaced the FN.20 turret with four Browning .303 Mark IIs. The Martin turret carried two 0.5-inch Browning Mark II machine guns which packed much more punch than the .303s of the older turret. However, these Martin turrets arrived too late for inclusion in the first 50 aircraft built by Austin and these were therefore referred to as Mark VII (Interim). Another 180 true Mark VIIs were built at Longbridge. Two sub-variants of the VII existed, the "Far East" (B VII FE) for use in tropical climates and the B VII "Western Union", which went to France.

B.X

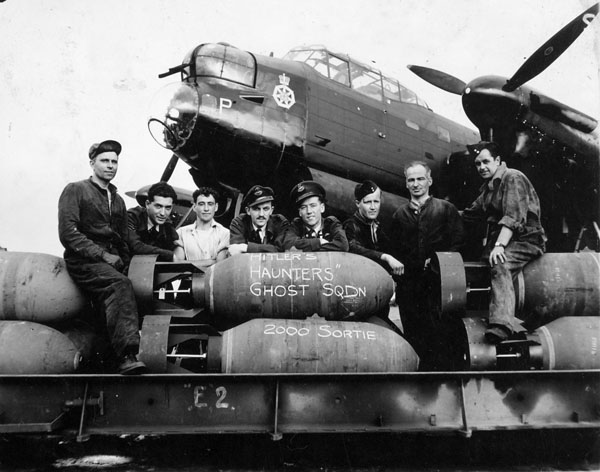
Propaganda shot before bombing up an RCAF 428 Squadron B Mk X. This aircraft carries the early "needle-blade" propellers.

The B.X was a Canadian-built B.III with Canadian- and US-made instruments and electrics. In later batches, the heavier Martin 250CE was substituted for the Nash & Thomson FN-50 mid-upper turret, mounted further forward to maintain centre of gravity balance. Canada was a long-term operator of the Lancaster, using modified aircraft after the war for maritime patrol, search and rescue and photo-reconnaissance until 1964. The last flight by the RCAF was by F/L Lynn Garrison in KB976, on 4 July 1964 at the Calgary International Air Show. In the 1970’s KB976 was moved to Woodford for overhaul to flight condition. Sadly the aircraft was damaged in a hanger collapse.
During the Second World War, Canada's Victory Aircraft (what later became Avro Canada) was responsible for the development of the Lancastrian, which was duly designated the XPP for Mark 10 Passenger Plane. Six were built for Trans Canada Airlines.
Postwar the RCAF modified the B X (as the Lancaster Mk 10) to fill a variety of roles, with specific designations for each role. These included:
- 10AR: Area Reconnaissance – three aircraft modified for surveillance operations over the Arctic. Fitted with the lengthened nose (40 inches (100 cm) longer) and carrying cameras and ELINT equipment. Remained in service until 1964.
- 10BR: Bomber Reconnaissance. Minimally modified variant with additional windows for observers in the rear fuselage. 13 converted.
- 10DC: Drone controller with Ryan Firebee drones – two modified in 1957 and operational until 1961.
- 10MR (later 10MP): Maritime Reconnaissance or Maritime Patrol anti-submarine warfare (ASW) aircraft, based on BR with the mid-upper turret removed. 70–75 converted. In service from 1950 to 1955.
- 10N: Navigational trainer. Five converted.
- 10O: Orenda jet engine testbed for the engine used in the Avro CF-100.
- 10P: Photo reconnaissance mapping duties. 11 converted 1948–1950. Retired 1964.
- 10S&R: Interim search-and-rescue aircraft, minimally modified 10S. Replaced by disarmed 10BR and 10MRs.
- 10S : Standard – designation applied to baseline standard, with Merlin 224 engines, Martin mid-upper turret and H2S radar, for aircraft retained postwar for future use. Sometimes referred to by unofficial designation 10U.
B.XV

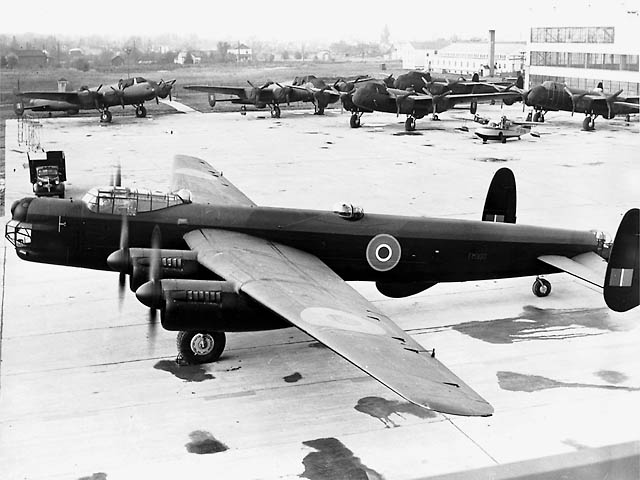
The sole, Canadian-built, Lancaster B.XV/Lincoln B.XV

As per Lancaster B.IV/Lincoln B.1 but built in Canada and renamed Avro Lincoln XV. One example was built before the order was cancelled when the war ended.

== Operators ==
- Argentina
- Australia
- Canada
- Egypt
- France
- United Kingdom
- New Zealand
- Poland
- Soviet Union
- Sweden

== Surviving aircraft ==
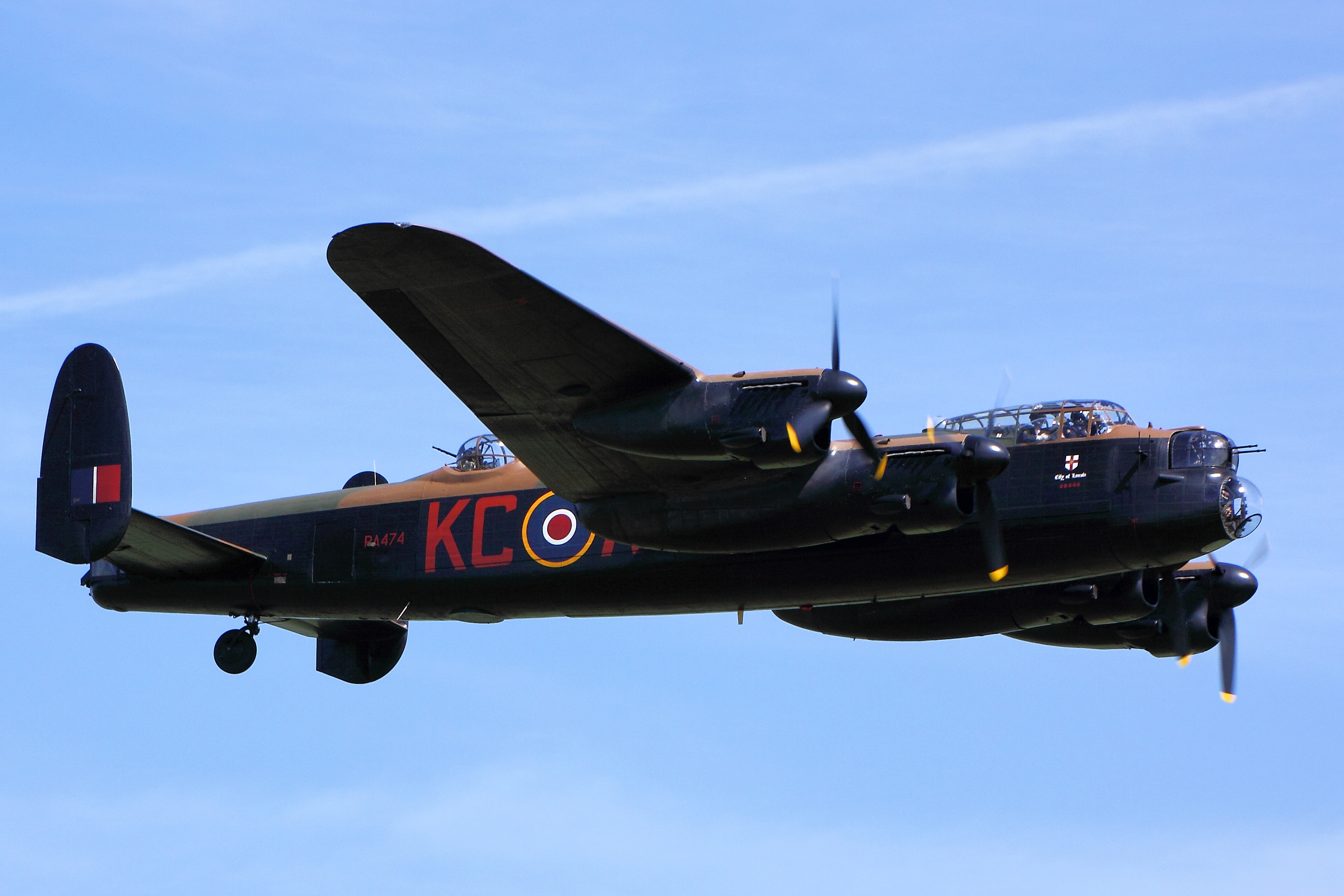
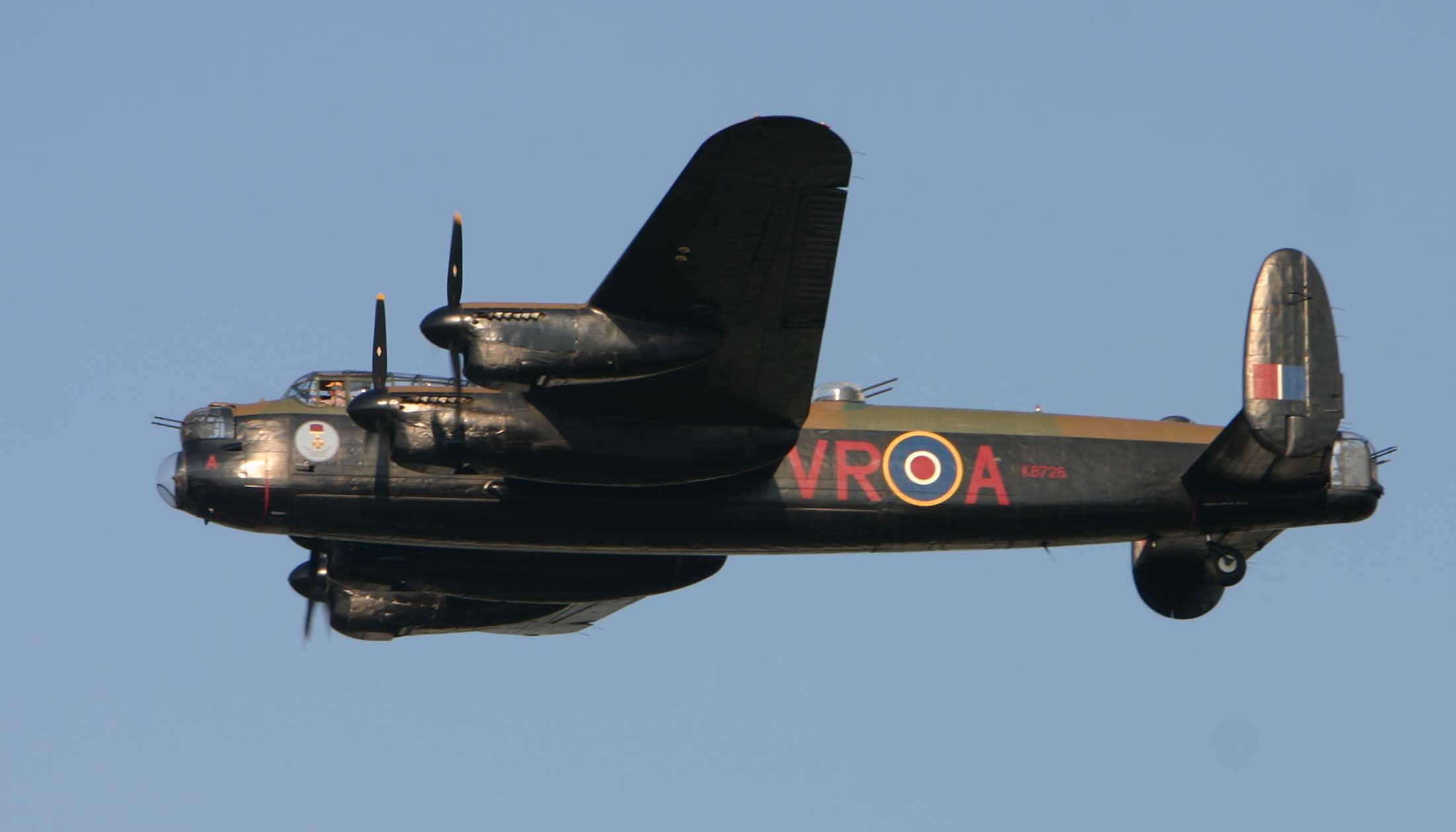
The two surviving airworthy Lancasters – PA474 (left) and FM213 (right)

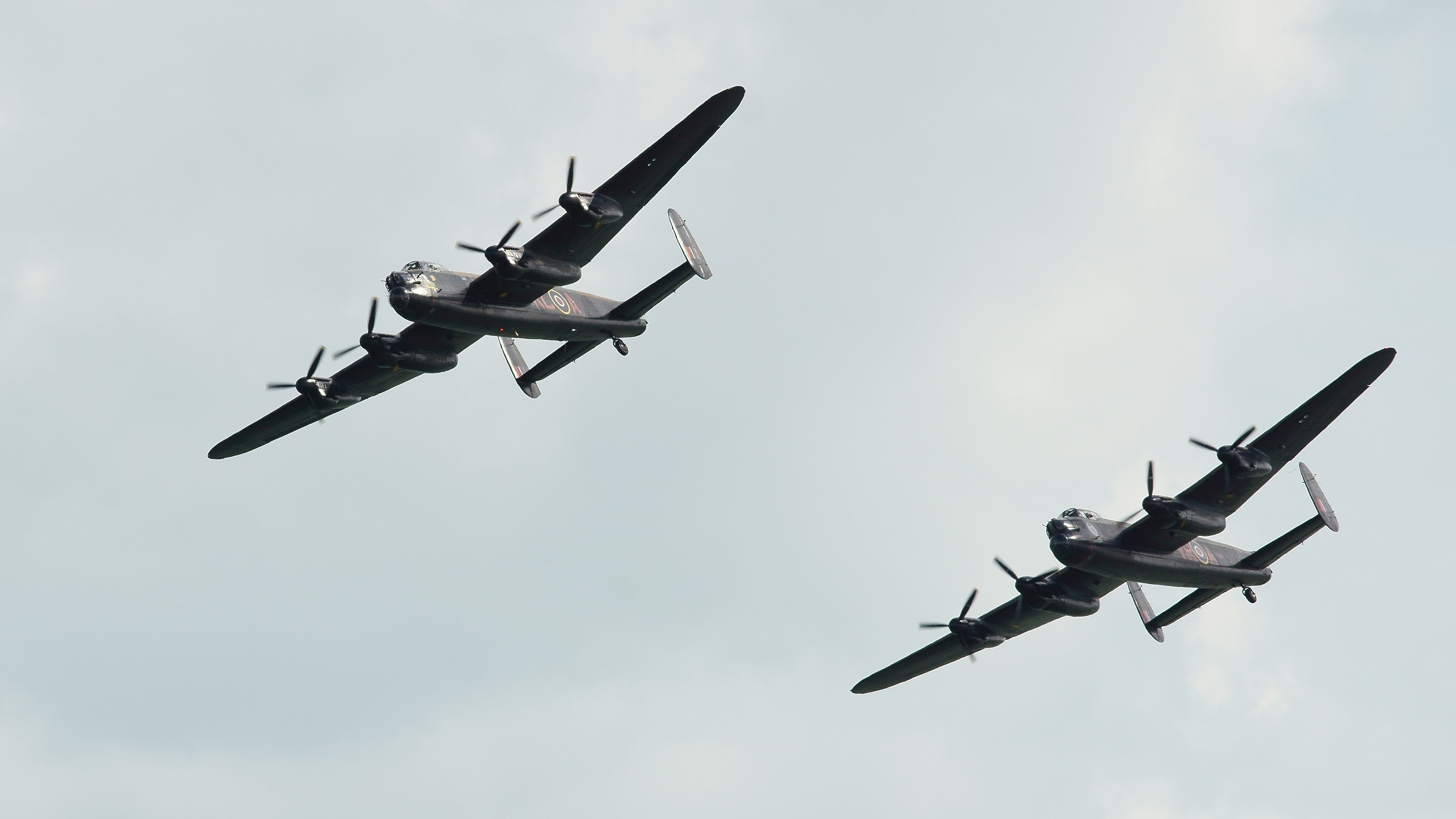
The two surviving airworthy Lancasters during a joint display at the Eastbourne International Airshow in 2014

Of the 17 surviving and largely intact Lancasters known to exist, two are airworthy: PA474 is a Lancaster B.I operated by the Battle of Britain Memorial Flight, based at RAF Coningsby in Lincolnshire, UK; FM213, named the "Mynarski Memorial Lancaster" and painted with VR-A (nicknamed VeRA) to honour Andrew Mynarski, is a Lancaster B.X operated by the Canadian Warplane Heritage Museum in Hamilton, Ontario, Canada.

Two other Lancasters exist with working engines, though not airworthy; like the airworthy pair, these are also found one each in Britain and Canada. The B MkVII Just Jane, NX611, is based in the East Kirkby Lincolnshire Aviation Heritage Centre, just 9 miles (14 km) east-northeast of PA474 at RAF Coningsby; it is able to taxi but is not airworthy, though there are plans to eventually return it to flight. The Bomber Command Museum of Canada, in Nanton, Alberta, is home to FM159, nicknamed Bazalgette, which has been restored from a vandalised state and is able to taxi under its own power.

In 2014, the two airworthy Lancasters (Canadian FM213 and British PA474) toured the UK in a series of joint aerial and ground displays.

In 2017, after more than 50 years on display in Edmundston, New Brunswick, Lancaster KB882 moved to the National Air Force Museum of Canada in Trenton, Ontario, where it is to be restored and placed alongside the museum's restored RAF Handley Page Halifax heavy bomber, NA337.

For the 2018 flying season, to commemorate the 75th anniversary of Operation Chastise, the Canadian FM213 Lancaster was painted in the markings used by Guy Gibson's 617 Squadron aircraft (Code AJ-G, ED932) when he commanded the "Dambusters" raids.

== Specifications (Lancaster I) ==
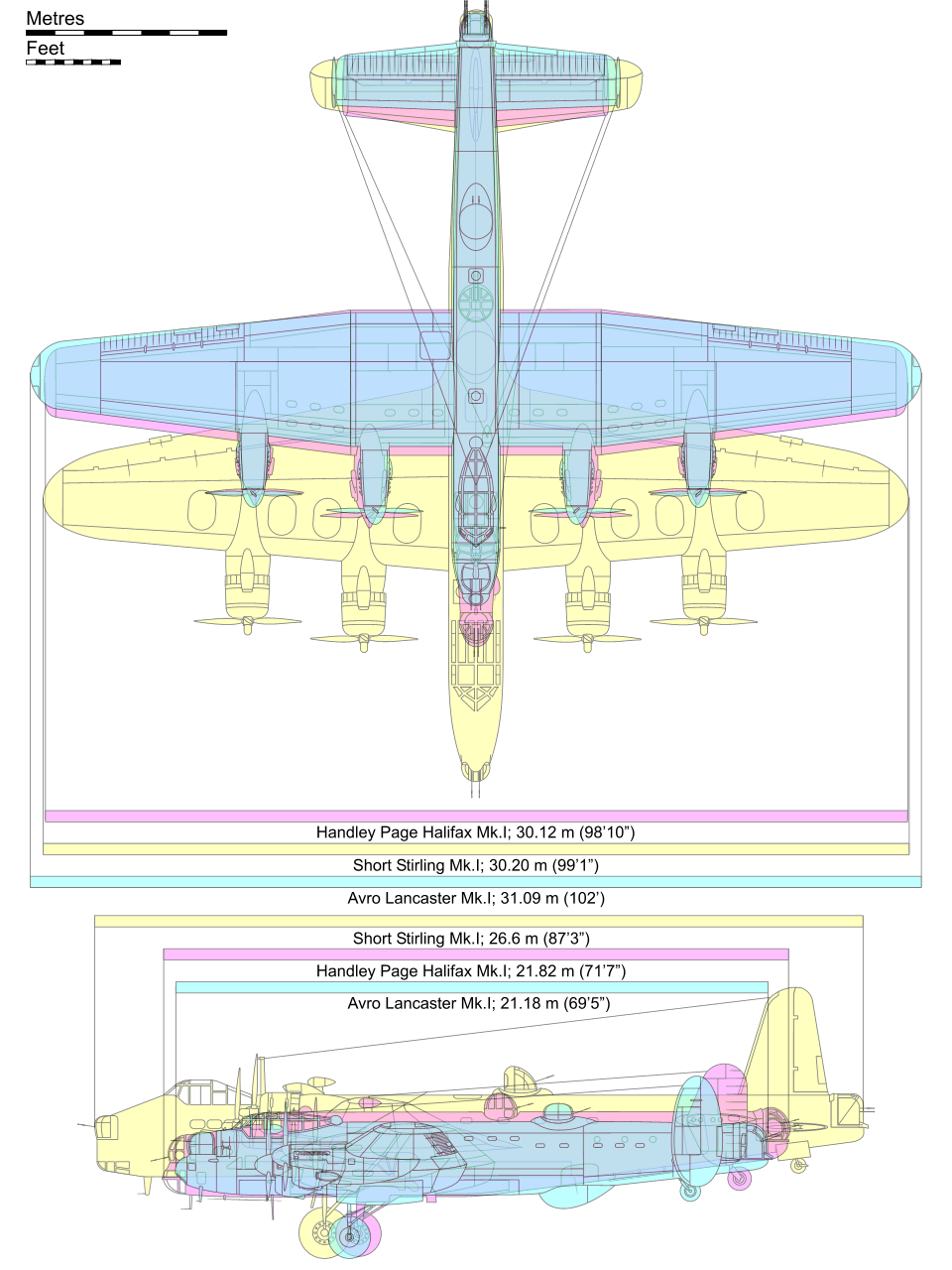
Diagram comparing the Lancaster (blue) with its RAF contemporaries; the Short Stirling (yellow) and the Handley Page Halifax (pink).

Data from Avro Aircraft since 1908, The Secret Years: Flight Testing at Boscombe Down 1939–1945, The Avro Lancaster I: Aircraft in Profile Number 65

General characteristics

- Crew: 7: pilot, flight engineer, navigator, bomb aimer/nose gunner, wireless operator, mid-upper and rear gunners
- Length: 69 ft 4 in (21.13 m)
- Wingspan: 102 ft 0 in (31.09 m)
- Height: 20 ft 6 in (6.25 m)
- Wing area: 1,297 sq ft (120.5 m^{2})
- Airfoil: root: NACA 23018; tip: NACA 23012
- Empty weight: 36,900 lb (16,738 kg)
- Gross weight: 55,000 lb (24,948 kg)
- Max takeoff weight: 68,000 lb (30,844 kg)
- Fuel capacity: 2,145 imp gal (9,750 L)
- Powerplant: 4 × Rolls-Royce Merlin XX V-12 liquid-cooled piston engines, 1,280 hp (950 kW) each
- Propellers: 3-bladed

Performance

- Maximum speed: 282 mph (454 km/h, 245 kn) at 63,000 lb (28,576 kg) and 13,000 ft (4,000 m) altitude
- Cruise speed: 200 mph (320 km/h, 170 kn)
- Range: 2,530 mi (4,070 km, 2,200 nmi)
- Service ceiling: 21,400 ft (6,500 m) at 63,000 lb (29,000 kg)
- Rate of climb: 720 ft/min (3.7 m/s) at 63,000 lb (29,000 kg) and 9,200 ft (2,800 m) altitude

Armament

- Guns: Two 0.303-inch (7.7 mm) Browning Mark II machine guns in nose turret, two 0.303-inch Browning Mark II machine guns in upper turret, and four 0.303-inch Browning Mark II machine guns in the rear turret. (Early aircraft had two Brownings in a ventral turret aimed from within the aircraft via a periscope.)
- Maximum normal bomb load of 14,000 lb (6,400 kg) of bombs
- Maximum specialist bomb load of 22,000 lb (10,000 kg) of bombs

Avionics

- H2S radar in later variants
- T1154 and R1155 radios
- Various other navigational aides and countermeasures

== Notable pilots and crew members ==
=== Victoria Cross awards ===
Many Lancaster crew members were highly decorated for their actions while flying the aircraft. Amongst those who received the Victoria Cross were:

- Squadron Leader Ian Willoughby Bazalgette
- Wing Commander Guy Gibson
- Warrant Officer Norman Cyril Jackson
- Pilot Officer Andrew Mynarski
- Squadron Leader John Dering Nettleton
- Squadron Leader Robert Anthony Maurice Palmer
- Flight Lieutenant William Reid
- Flight Sergeant George Thompson
- Group Captain Leonard Cheshire – for conduct on more than 100 missions in aircraft including the Lancaster, Mosquito and Mustang
- Captain (acting Major) Edwin Swales

== Notable appearances in media ==
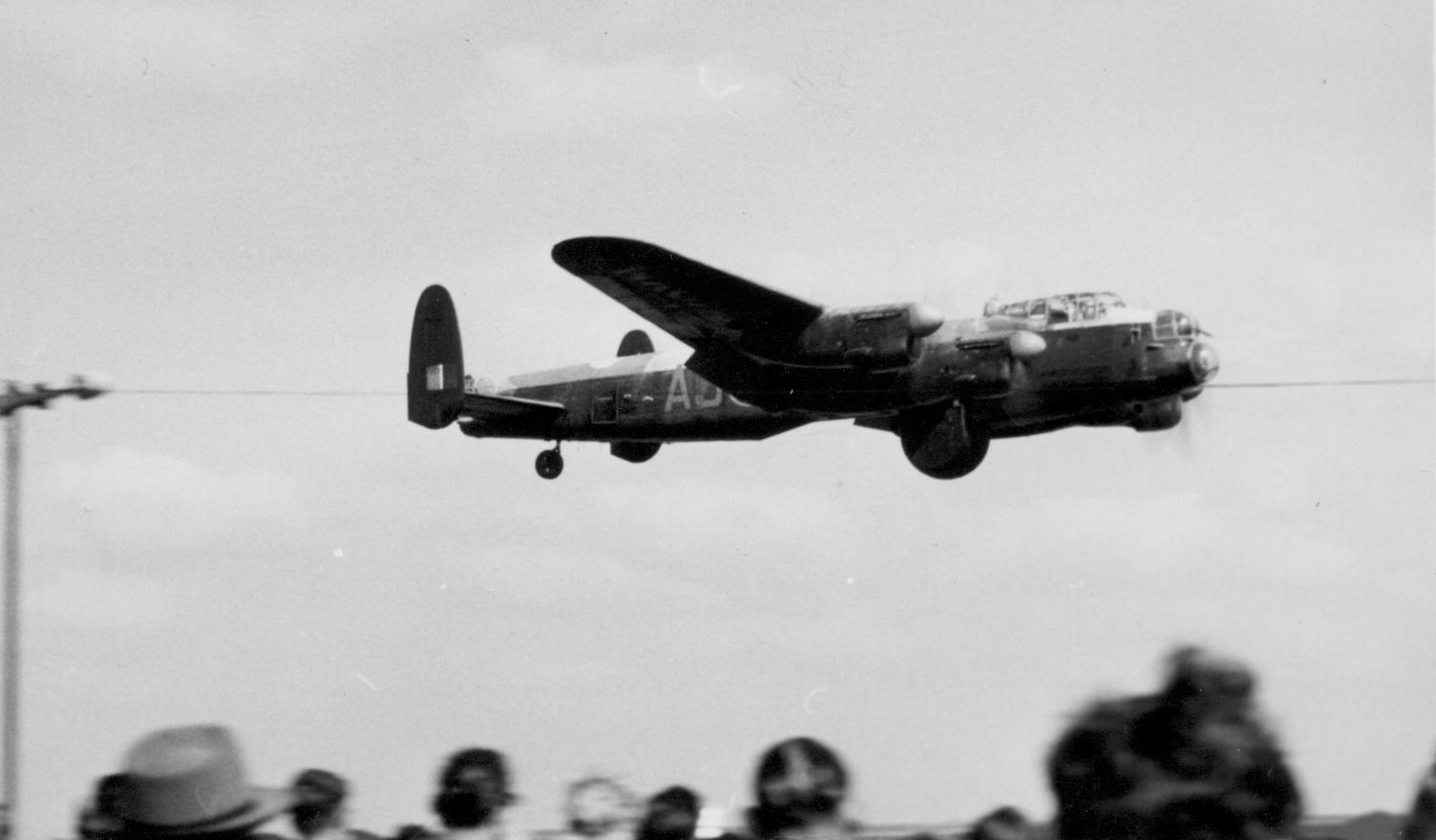
When the 1955 film The Dam Busters was made, the bomb remained classified so the producers created a convincing alternative.

The Avro Lancaster featured prominently in the 1955 film The Dam Busters, and a number of B VII Lancasters in storage were modified to the original configuration of the B.III (Special) for use on screen. Lancasters play a prominent part in Appointment in London with Dirk Bogarde.

== See also ==
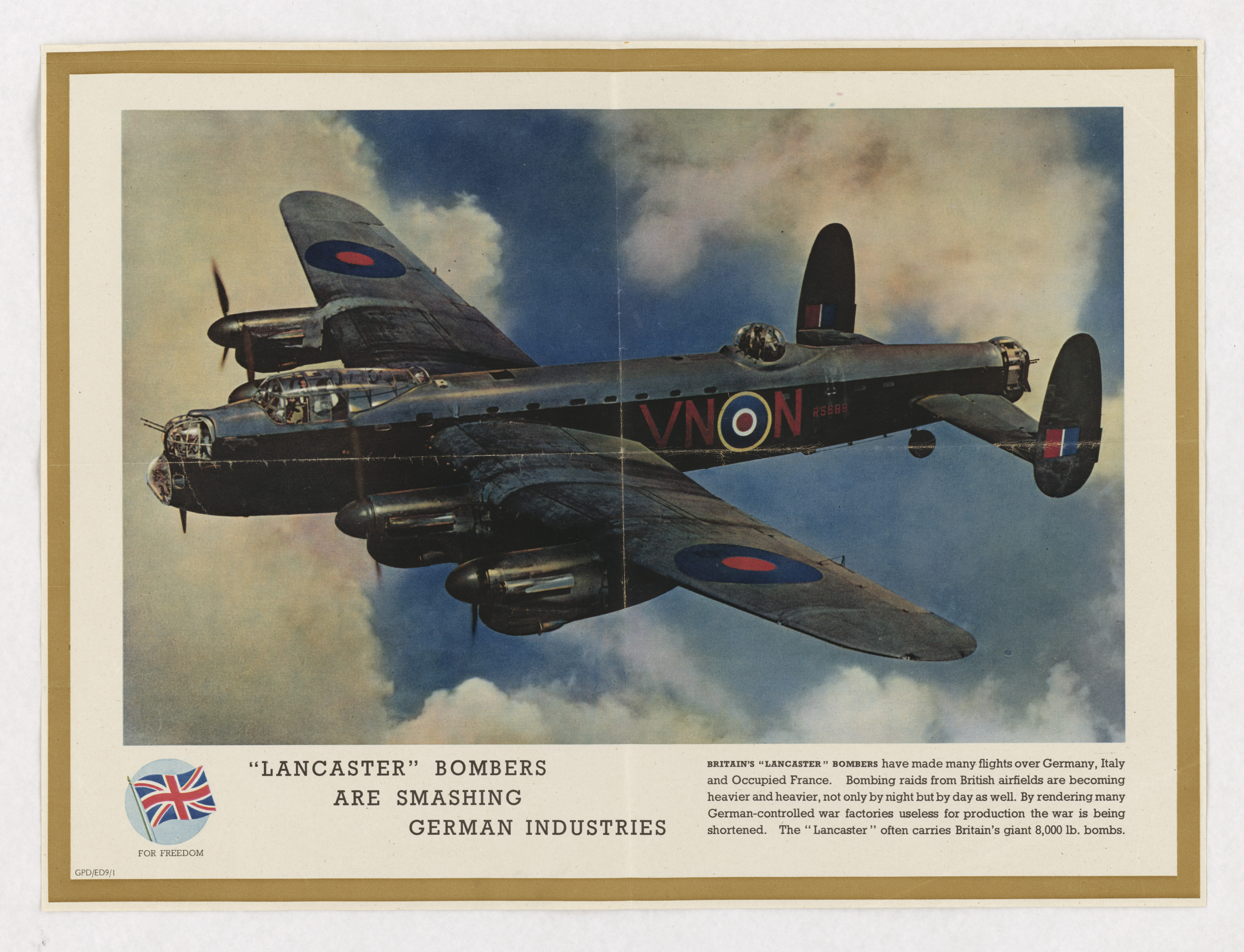
Propaganda poster

- On Freedom's Wings, a sculpture in Lincolnshire, England

Related development

- Avro Lancastrian (Interim VIP Transport with fairings)
- Avro Lincoln (originally designated Lancaster Mk.IV, longer wings and fuselage and improved armament)
- Avro Lincolnian (Interim VIP transport like Lancastrian but based on Lincoln)
- Avro Manchester (precursor with unsuccessful Vulture engines)
- Avro Shackleton (Maritime patrol which used Lincoln wings with new fuselage)
- Avro Tudor (Airliner with Lincoln Wings and new cigar-shaped fuselage)
- Avro York (Transport with new fuselage)

Aircraft of comparable role, configuration, and era

- Boeing B-17 Flying Fortress
- Consolidated B-24 Liberator
- Focke-Wulf Fw 200 Condor
- Handley Page Halifax
- Heinkel He 177
- Messerschmitt Me 264
- Nakajima G5N
- Petlyakov Pe-8
- Piaggio P.108
- Short Stirling
- Supermarine B.12/36
- Vickers Windsor

Related lists

- List of aircraft of the Royal Air Force
- List of aircraft of World War II
- List of bomber aircraft
