= Wallace McIntosh =

Royal Air Force officer

- Born: 27 March 1920; Tarves, Aberdeenshire, Scotland
- Died: 4 June 2007 (aged 87); Aberdeen, Scotland
- Military career
- Allegiance: United Kingdom
- Branch: Royal Air Force
- Service years: 1939–1948
- Rank: Flight Lieutenant
- Conflicts: Second World War
- Awards: Distinguished Flying Cross & Bar; Distinguished Flying Medal

Flight Lieutenant Wallace McIntosh DFC & Bar, DFM (27 March 1920 – 4 June 2007) flew 55 bombing missions with the RAF during the Second World War as a rear gunner in Lancaster bombers. McIntosh was regarded as the most successful air gunner in Bomber Command during the Second World War, and was credited with shooting down eight enemy aircraft.

Seven of McIntosh's claims were shared with a fellow crew member, mid-upper gunner C. B. "Larry" Sutherland (RCAF). McIntosh also claimed two "probables" and one "damaged," which was also shared with Sutherland. In a single operation on 7/8 June 1944, McIntosh and Sutherland claimed three German night fighters.

== Early life ==
McIntosh was born in a barn in Tarves in Aberdeenshire during a blizzard. His mother was an unmarried teenage servant. He was raised by his grandparents alongside their seven children, moving from farm to farm in Perthshire and Aberdeenshire in search of seasonal work. He attended fourteen schools, finally leaving at the age of 13. He worked as an agricultural labourer, but helped to support his family by poaching sheep, salmon and pheasants. He later became a gamekeeper.

== Royal Air Force service ==
On the outbreak of the Second World War, he rode his bicycle the 30 miles (50 km) to Dundee, aiming to join the RAF, but was rejected on account of his poor education. At the urging of a local priest, the RAF relented and he was recruited as an aircraftman. He served on the ground, but became an air gunner in March 1943, and joined 207 Squadron at RAF Langar, near Nottingham, as a mid-upper turret gunner in the Lancaster bomber flown by Flying Officer Fred Richardson. He claimed two German aircraft "probably destroyed" during his first tour of 32 missions, and was awarded the Distinguished Flying Medal on 15 October 1943. After his first tour of duty, he became an air gunnery instructor.

He was commissioned pilot officer on 5 June 1943, and promoted flying officer on 5 December 1943. He returned to active duty with 207 Squadron at RAF Spilsby in Lincolnshire in February 1944, as a rear gunner in the Lancaster flown by Wing Commander John Grey, the squadron's commander. He shot down a Bf 110 in a raid over Mailly-le-Camp in Champagne on 3 May 1944 (The only kill he had without Sutherland, whose logbook records no flight that day).

On 7 June 1944, he joined a raid of 112 Lancaster bombers in support of the D-Day landings the previous day, attacking a concentration of German tanks in woods near Cerisy-la-Forêt, between Bayeux and St Lô in Normandy. He and a colleague, Canadian Pilot Officer Larry Sutherland, together shot down two Ju 88s on the way to the target. In the return journey, they shot down an Me 210 over Beachy Head. Both gunners were awarded the Distinguished Flying Cross (DFC) in the London Gazette 11 July 1944.

The citation reads:

Flying Officer Wallace MC!NTOSH, D.F.M. (149980), R.A.F.V.R., 207 Sqn.

Pilot Officer Clarence Bentley SUTHERLAND (Can/J.86114), R.C.A.F., 207 Sqn.

One night in June, 1944, these officers were rear and mid-upper gunners respectively of an aircraft detailed to attack Cerisy. Just after crossing the enemy coast Flying Officer Mclntosh sighted a Junkers 88 coming in to attack. He promptly warned his pilot who took the necessary combat manoeuvre. Both gunners then opened fire hitting the enemy aircraft with well placed bursts, causing it to spin towards the ground with both its engines on fire. Almost immediately another Junkers 88 was sighted. As the enemy aircraft came into close range, Flying Officer Mclntosh and his co-gunner met the attacker with devastating bursts of fire which caused it to explode in the air. Half an hour later these gunners engaged yet a third enemy aircraft. Following their accurately placed bursts of fire the enemy fighter fell away and was seen to catch fire before it hit the sea. Flying Officer Mclntosh and Pilot Officer Sutherland defended their aircraft with great skill and resolution and undoubtedly played a large part in its safe return. Their achievement was worthy of high praise.

McIntosh received a congratulatory Postagram from the usually taciturn Air Chief Marshal Sir Arthur Harris.

In July 1944, he shot down two German night fighters in a raid on Stuttgart and was awarded a Bar to his DFC on 8 December 1944 at the end of his second tour of a further 23 operations.

He was promoted to flight lieutenant on 5 June 1945 having held the acting rank for some time. McIntosh applied to extend his service postwar and was granted a 4-year extended commission from 18 December 1945 as a flying officer. He resigned his commission and left the RAF on 19 June 1948.

== Later life ==
He worked as a salesman of agricultural foodstuffs in Scotland, and then worked for a seed merchant.

His biography, Gunning for the Enemy, was published in 2003.

He married Christina Cooper in 1957. They had one son James and two daughters Christina Anne and Mary. His wife died in 1991. He died from lung cancer at Aberdeen Royal Infirmary in Aberdeen. He was survived by his children.

== Sources ==
- Larry Sutherland
- Obituary, The Independent, 15 June 2007
- Obituary, The Times, 15 June 2007
- Obituary, The Daily Telegraph, 15 June 2007
- 207 Squadron Royal Air Force Association
- RAF gunner war hero dies aged 87, BBC, 6 June 2007
