= Automatic Gun-Laying Turret =

Radar-directed, rear gun turret fitted to some British bombers in World War II

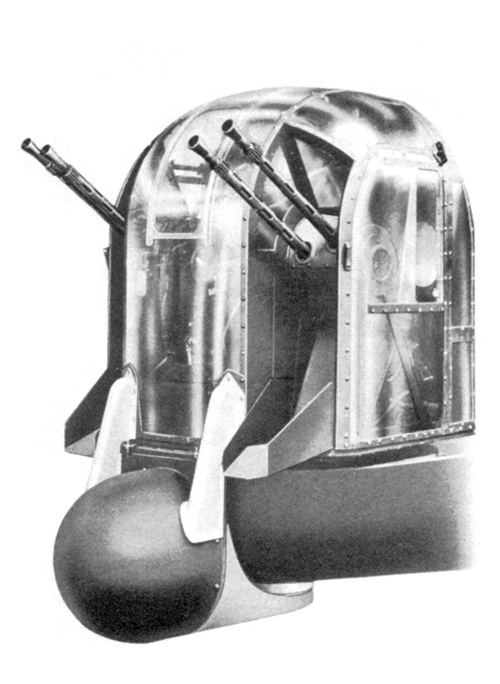
The AGLT Village Inn FN121 tail turret as fitted on a Lancaster – the bulbous radome covers the parabolic scanning aerial.

The Automatic Gun-Laying Turret (AGLT), also known as the Frazer-Nash FN121, was a radar-directed, rear gun turret fitted to some British bombers from 1944. AGLT incorporated both a low-power tail warning radar and fire-control system, which could detect approaching enemy fighters, aim and automatically trigger machine guns – in total darkness or cloud cover if necessary. The radar warning and fire-control system itself was commonly known by the code names Village Inn and "Z Equipment", as well as the serial number TR3548.

It was intended that all Royal Air Force bombers, and other Allied aircraft attached to Bomber Command would have an IFF infra-red nose lamp, which would allow rear gunners to avoid friendly fire. In practice, however, Allied aircraft without lamps often crossed paths with AGLT aircraft and, even when they were fitted and operational, the lamps were not always visible to gunners, for various reasons. As a result, Village Inn was generally used purely as an early warning system. According to the official history of the RCAF during World War II, fully automated "blind-firing" was used by gunners in only four out of every 1,000 sorties.

== Development ==
The system was devised by a team led by Philip Dee and designed under the aegis of chief designer Alan Hodgkin, after receiving a request from the Air Ministry for such a system in early 1943. Village Inn was evaluated and tested by the Telecommunications Research Establishment (TRE) at RAF Defford using the Lancaster Mark I serial number ND712 Lancaster Mark III JB705 and Mk II LL736 and LL737 and subsequently put into production.

The system consisted of a transmitter/receiver unit mounted in the navigator's compartment, operating through a conical scanning parabolic aerial attached to rear turrets. It worked on a wavelength of 9.1 cm (3 GHz) with a pulse repetition frequency of 660 Hertz. The magnetron used was the CV186 of approx 35kW. The electronics sent a signal back to the turret, where it was displayed on a cathode-ray tube (CRT) display screen positioned adjacent to the gun sight, the image of which was projected on to the Mark IIC gyro gunsight via a semi-transparent mirror.

Initially, ranging information was provided only at the transmitter situated in the navigator's compartment and was read off to the gunner over the intercom, the gunner using foot pedals to set the target range on the sight. In production equipment the process was made automatic, the range information being fed electronically directly into the gunsight, with the navigator's "running commentary" only being retained for the benefit of the rest of the crew. The gunner simply manoeuvred his guns to place the "blip" in the centre of the gunsight's reticule and opened fire when the range was appropriate. Windage, bullet drop, and other factors were already calculated by the gunsight.

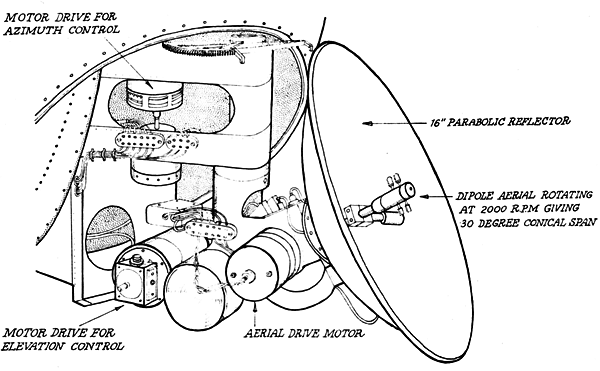
A diagram of the Village Inn scanning system

The first squadron to use Village Inn operationally was No. 101 Squadron RAF, based at Ludford Magna, in the autumn of 1944, followed soon afterwards by No. 49 in the attack on Darmstadt on September 11/12, 156 and 635 Squadrons.

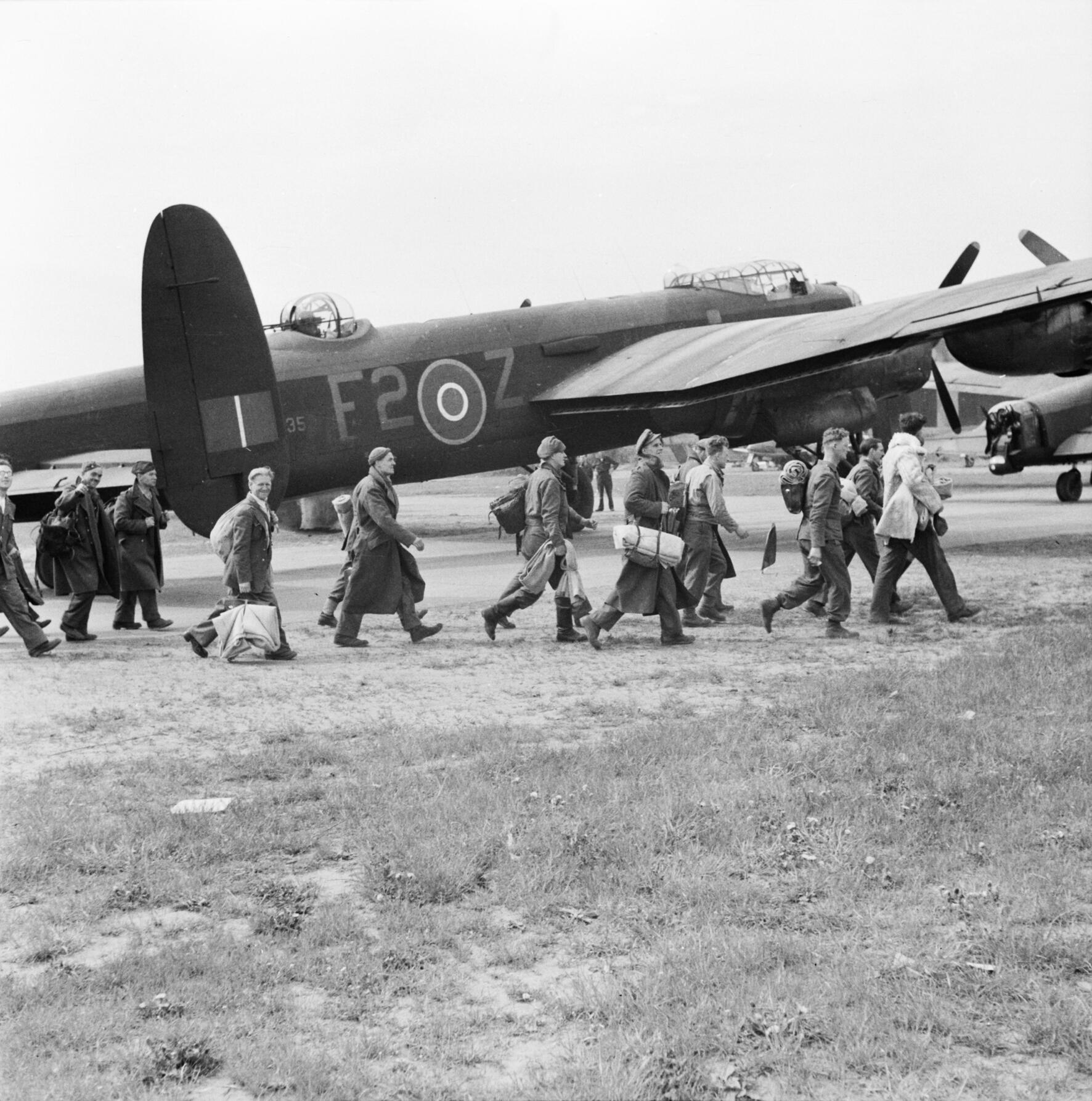
Liberated prisoners during Operation Exodus with an Avro Lancaster of No. 635 Squadron RAF at Lübeck, Germany, 11 May 1945. The Lancaster at right is fitted with the AGLT "Village Inn" tail turret.

Village Inn was eventually produced in four Marks:

- AGLT Mark I — initial design — Airborne Radio Installation (ARI) 5559.
- AGLT Mark II — modified, improved, Mark I — soon discontinued — ARI 5561.
- AGLT Mark III — scanning aerial mounted remotely from turret. Scan independent of turret's movements — ARI 5562.
- AGLT Mark IV — ARI 5632

The system was also fitted to the Rose turret (twin 0.5 inch guns) on at least one Avro Lincoln B.Mk II, although how many is not known. Some Lincolns fitted with the Boulton Paul Type D tail turret also incorporated the equipment.

A similar type of system was produced in the US by the Emerson Electric Company of St. Louis, Missouri when an Emerson Model III tail turret was equipped with the Emerson APG8 Blind Tracking Radar and fitted to the Canadian-built Lancaster KB805. The system was found to have no advantages over the British system and the project was subsequently dropped.

== See also ==
- Telecommunications Research Establishment
- RAF Defford
- List of World War II electronic warfare equipment
