= The Scarecrows =

1981 young adult novel by Robert Westall

- First edition
- Author: Robert Westall
- Language: English
- Genre: Children's supernatural fiction, psychological novel, ghost story
- Publisher: Chatto & Windus (UK) Greenwillow Books (US)
- Publication date: 1981
- Publication place: United Kingdom
- Media type: Print (hardback and paperback)
- Pages: 159 pp (first edition)
- ISBN: 070112556X
- OCLC: 8046301
- LC Class: PZ7.W51953 Sc 1981

The Scarecrows is a young-adult novel by Robert Westall, published by Chatto & Windus in 1981. It is a psychological novel with a supernatural twist, featuring a thirteen-year-old boy's reaction to his mother's courtship and remarriage six years after his father's death. It deals with themes of rage, isolation and fear. Beside the inner themes, it "tells of a boy and his family brought to the brink of destruction by sinister external forces" and it may be called a ghost story. Its US Library of Congress Subject Headings are remarriage, stepfathers, and horror stories.

Westall and The Scarecrows won the annual Carnegie Medal for British children's books. Thus he became the second writer with two such honours, having won the 1975 Medal for The Machine Gunners.

William Morrow and Company published the US edition under its Greenwillow Books imprint within the calendar year.

== Plot summary ==
The story is a third-person limited narrative, with the point of view entirely that of Simon Wood—his thoughts, feelings and memories, the things he sees and experiences, conversations he has, conversations he overhears. The novel opens at Simon's boarding school in the south of England, where the poisonous atmosphere of bullying and denigration has nurtured Simon's "devils", as he describes his blind rages. He first sees Joe Moreton there, when the man has given Simon's mother a lift to an event at the school. Simon loathes him at first sight and regards him as a "yob", unimpressed by his fame as an artist.

At an art gallery Simon overhears a conversation making clear that Joe and his mother are dating, which enrages the boy. When his mother tells him she intends to marry Joe, he vainly begs her not to and then refuses to attend the wedding. But he must finally join his mother, his sister, and Joe at their new home in Cheshire. There both his mother's happiness and his sister's adoration of Joe incense him, for he regards them as betraying his father's memory. A neighbouring unused water mill, separated from the house by a turnip field, provides a refuge for him, but it harbours a sinister secret. During the war, the miller was murdered by his wife and her lover.

By his own attitude and actions, Simon becomes increasingly isolated. When he is driven to call on his father's spirit for support, it appears that the call is intercepted by the spirits at the mill, which manifest as scarecrows and imperceptibly advance across the turnip field to threaten the family. When Simon's friend Tris la Chard comes to stay, he helps Simon to face up to reality and defeat the spirits.

== Characters ==
Present

- Simon Wood, a thirteen-year-old boy
- Bowdon, a foul-minded bully in Simon's dormitory at school
- Tris la Chard, Simon's droll friend
- Deborah Wood, Simon's mother, a brigadier's daughter and major's widow
- Jane Wood, Simon's younger sister
- Joe Moreton, a famous artist with a talent for cruelly-revealing cartoons
- "Nunk", a British Army colonel, Simon's father's former parachuting instructor and friend
- Tom Mercyfull, an ancient garrulous gardener
- Mrs Meegan, an artist's model

Past

- Major Derek Wood, Simon's risk-loving father, who died in Aden six years earlier
- The young miller, who owned the mill during the Second World War
- Josie Cragg, the young miller's wife
- Ray Starkey, the mill manager, Josie's lover

== Literary significance and reception ==
By conferring the 1981 Carnegie Medal, the Library Association named The Scarecrows the year's best book for children or young adults written by a British subject. The novel has been described as a book "full of anger. Simon ... loathes his stepfather and resents his mother's marital happiness; and it is obviously his own fury and malice that brings to life the Scarecrows, grown from clothes left in the nearby ruined water-mill by the participants in a long-past murderous triangle of passion." The effectiveness of the horror aspect of the story is emphasised in Reading for Enjoyment, in which it is described as a "book to make the hairs rise on the back of your neck".

The Guardian newspaper named The Scarecrows one of ten books recommended for teenage boys in 2001, calling it an "intelligent and menacing novel".

Awards
Preceded by City of Gold	Carnegie Medal recipient 1981	Succeeded by The Haunting
