= Dorsal gunner =

A dorsal gunner, mid-upper gunner or top gunner is an air gunner responsible for operating a gun position or turret located on the upper (dorsal) fuselage, between the cockpit and tail of some military aircraft.

Between World War I and the 1950s, most heavy bombers, large attack/strike aircraft and long-range maritime patrol aircraft featured a dorsal, mid-upper or top gun position.

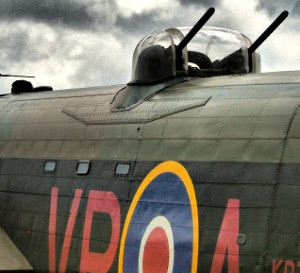
The Martin 250 CE or Model 23A turret, with twin Browning M2 .50 (12.7 mm) machine guns, was used on several different Allied bombers during World War II, including the Avro Lancaster B Mk X (shown here) and some Consolidated B-24 Liberators.

During World War II, the mid-upper gunners of British Commonwealth heavy bomber crews were regarded as the primary observer of a crew, and were responsible for detecting the approach of enemy fighter aircraft, as well preventing collisions with friendly aircraft and accidental mid-air bomb strikes.

== See also ==
- Nose gunner
- Tail gunner
- Ventral gunner
