= Blitzcat =

1989 novel by Robert Westall

- First edition
- Author: Robert Westall
- Language: English
- Genre: Historical novel
- Publisher: Macmillan
- Publication date: 1 January 1989
- Publication place: United Kingdom
- Media type: Print (Hardback; Paperback)
- Pages: 231 pp (1st edition)
- ISBN: 0-333-47498-8

Blitzcat is a 1989 novel by Robert Westall, and recipient of the Nestlé Smarties Book Prize.

== Plot ==
Blitzcat is told through the point of view of a black domestic cat, called Lord Gort, as she travels across England during the Blitz in search of her owner, who is serving with the RAF. The story includes a detailed depiction of the bombing of Coventry.

== Reception ==
In 1989, Blitzcat was named winner of the Smarties Book Prize in the 9 – 11 years category. In 1994, the American Library Association named Blitzcat as one of their 100 Best Books for Young Adults of the previous 25 years.

Publishers Weekly wrote "Sensitive readers will realize at once that the story of Lord Gort is one of those tales that, once begun, demands to be finished." and "Each of these glimpses of men and women in wartime is as perfect as a pearl; Lord Gort's journey is the single black thread on which the precious beads are strung."

It has been studied at school and appears on reading lists.
