= Urn Burial (novel) =

1987 novel by Robert Westall

- Author: Robert Westall
- Cover artist: Alun Hood
- Language: English
- Genre: Science fiction novel
- Publisher: Viking Kestrel
- Publication date: 1987
- Media type: Print (Hardcover & Paperback)

Urn Burial is a 1987 young adult science fiction novel by Robert Westall. It involves alien races who resemble cats and dogs.

== Setting ==
Westall has set Urn Burial in the Pennine chain of northern England, near the Scottish border. The Cumbrian fell country is an isolated land of rain, prehistoric ruins, and heather. The sheep that run loose on the steep hills are still a major source of income, and shepherding is a respected profession. Life remains rather primitive on the fells, but the homes have electricity and running water and the shepherds reach their flocks on ATVs.
