= The Cats of Seroster =

1984 novel by Robert Westall

- First edition
- Author: Robert Westall
- Language: English
- Genre: Children's fantasy
- Publisher: Macmillan Publishers
- Publication date: 1984
- Publication place: United Kingdom
- Media type: Print (hardcover; paperback)
- Pages: 306
- ISBN: 0688039448

The Cats of Seroster is a children's fantasy novel by Robert Westall, published in 1984 by Pan Books. The novel is set in "vaguely medieval France" and is told in part from the perspective of domestic cats.

== Plot summary ==
Eighteen-year-old Cam is tricked into completing an errand in the distant city of Seroster. Once there he gets mixed up in dangerous palace intrigue.

== Reception ==
The novel received a dour reception. The Kirkus magazine concluded: "Despite some vividly imagined cat-world vignettes, then: a dense, demanding fable with only minor rewards."
