= Robert Westall =

English teacher and children's novelist (1929–1993)

- Born: Robert Atkinson; 7 October 1929; North Shields, Northumberland, England, UK
- Died: 15 April 1993 (aged 63); Warrington, England, UK
- Education: Durham University; Slade School of Art
- Occupation: Novelist
- Spouse: Jean Underhill (m. 1958)
- Children: 1 son
- Writing career
- Period: 1975–1993
- Genres: Children's literature, war, horror, drama
- Subjects: Second World War, adolescence
- Notable works: The Machine Gunners; The Scarecrows; Blitzcat; The Kingdom by the Sea; Gulf
- Notable awards: Carnegie Medal; 1975, 1982; Guardian Prize; 1991
- Website: robertwestall.com

Robert Atkinson Westall (7 October 1929 – 15 April 1993) was an English author and teacher known for fiction aimed at children and young people. Some of the latter cover complex, dark, and adult themes. He has been called "the dean of British war novelists". His first book, The Machine Gunners, won the 1975 Carnegie Medal for the year's outstanding children's book by a British subject. It was named among the top ten Medal-winners at the 70th anniversary celebration in 2007. Westall also won a second Carnegie (no one has yet won three), a Smarties Prize, and the once-in-a-lifetime Guardian Prize.

== Early life and career ==
Robert Westall was born 7 October 1929 in North Shields, Northumberland. He grew up there on Tyneside during the Second World War, which he used as the setting for many of his novels. He earned a Bachelor's degree in Fine Art at Durham University and a post-graduate degree in sculpture at the Slade School of Art in London in 1957. From 1953 until 1955, Westall did national service in the British Army as a lance corporal in the Royal Corps of Signals.

Westall then became a teacher, serving as Head of Art and Head of Careers at Sir John Deane's Grammar School in Northwich, Cheshire. Westall acted as a branch director of Samaritans in 1966–1975, while writing for papers such as Cheshire Life and The Cheshire Chronicle, and for The Guardian as an art critic.

== Writing ==
Westall was inspired to be a writer by telling his son Christopher stories about his experiences in the Second World War. His first book, The Machine Gunners, issued by Macmillan in 1975, told a Second World War story about English children who find "a crashed German bomber in the woods complete with machine gun". It was adapted as a BBC television serial in 1983. He returned to its setting in Garmouth, a fictionalised Tynemouth, in other novels, including The Watch House (1977) and Fathom Five (1979), which continues the Machine Gunners story. Christopher was killed in a motorbike accident at the age of 18 in 1978. He became the inspiration for The Devil on the Road (1978), commended for the Carnegie Medal, and for a short story in The Haunting of Chas McGill (1983).

Westall won a second Carnegie Medal for The Scarecrows (Chatto & Windus, 1981). He retired from teaching only in 1985 and tried dealing in antiques before focusing exclusively on writing. For Blitzcat (Bodley Head, 1989) he won the annual Smarties Prize in category 9–11 years, which in 1994 the American Library Association named as one of the hundred Best Books for Young Adults of the Last 25 years. He lastly won the once-in-a-lifetime Guardian Children's Fiction Prize for The Kingdom by the Sea (Methuen, 1990). Both that and Gulf (1992) were commended runners-up for the Carnegie Medal. (Note: Today there are usually eight books on the Carnegie shortlist. According to CCSU some runners-up through 2002 were Commended (from 1954) or Highly Commended (from 1966). The latter distinction became approximately annual in 1979; there were 29 highly commended books in 24 years including two in 1990 and one in 1992. •No one has won three Carnegies. Of the seven authors with two medals, six were active in 1966–2002 and all wrote at least one Highly Commended runner-up, led by Anne Fine with three and Westall with two. (Westall was also one of three "commended" for Devil on the Road (1978).) The latter tells of the home front during the Persian Gulf War.

From 1988 until his death Westall attended a writers' circle in Lymm where he helped to assist and mentor new writers.

== Death, memorial and legacy ==
Westall died on 15 April 1993 in Warrington Hospital of respiratory failure from pneumonia. At the time of his death, he lived in lodgings with his landlady, Lindy McKinnel, at 1 Woodland Avenue in the village of Lymm. He had his own cottage a few paces away, 107 Higher Lane, which he bought with book royalties and visited every day to do his writing. Previously he had lived at 20 Winnington Lane, Northwich and run Magpie Antiques, Church Street, Davenham.

As a journalist, Westall wrote for Cheshire Life, the Northwich Chronicle and the Warrington Guardian. A memorial service was held on 29 September 1993, at nearby All Saints' Church, Thelwall, Warrington. Tributes were paid by former teaching colleagues and Miriam Hodgson, editorial director (fiction) of Reed Children's Books. A blue plaque was placed on Westall's birthplace, 7 Vicarage Street, North Shields, the following year. There is also a Westall Walk across locations used by Westall in his stories.

In October 2006, A Trip to Tynemouth by the Japanese animator Hayao Miyazaki was published in Japan. It is based on "Blackham's Wimpy", a story first published in Westall's Break of Dark collection. The rival RAF crews in the story fly Vickers Wellington bombers. The nickname "Wimpy" comes from Wimpy in the Popeye cartoons.

== Selected bibliography ==
According to WorldCat, participating libraries hold editions of Westall's books in 17 foreign languages.

=== Novels ===
- The Machine Gunners (1975)
- The Wind Eye (1976)
- The Watch House (1977)
- The Devil on the Road (1978)
- Fathom Five (1979)
- The Scarecrows (1981)
- Break of Dark (1982)
- Futuretrack Five (1983)
- The Haunting of Chas McGill (1983)
- The Cats of Seroster (1984)
- Rachel and the Angel (1986)
- Urn Burial (1987)
- The Creature in the Dark (1988)
- Ghost Abbey (1988)
- Ghosts and Journeys (1988)
- Blitzcat (1989)
- The Call and Other Stories (1989)
- Old Man on a Horse (1989)
- A Walk on the Wild Side (1989)
- Echoes of War (1989)
- If Cats Could Fly (1990)
- The Kingdom by the Sea (1990)
- The Promise (1990)
- Stormsearch (1990)
- The Stones of Muncaster Cathedral (1991)
- Yaxley's Cat (1991)
- Fearful Lovers (1992)
- Gulf (1992)
- Falling into Glory (1993)
- A Place For Me (1993)
- Size Twelve (1993)
- The Wheatstone Pond (1993)
- A Place to Hide (1994)
- A Time of Fire (1994)
- The Witness (1994)
- Blitz (1995)
- Christmas Spirit (1995)
- The Night Mare (1995)
- Blizzard (1996)
- Harvest (1996)
- Love Match (1997)
- Voices in the Wind (1997)
- David and the Kittens (2003)

=== Short fiction collections ===
- Break of Dark (1982)
- The Haunting of Chas McGill and Other Stories (1983)
- Rachel and the Angel and Other Stories (1986)
- Ghosts and Journeys (1988)
- Antique Dust (1989)
- The Call and Other Stories (1989) (a.k.a. The Call and Other Strange Stories, 2003)
- The Stones of Muncaster Cathedral (1991) (a.k.a. In Camera and Other Stories, 1992)
- Fearful Lovers and Other Stories (1992, a.k.a. Fearful Lovers 1993)
- Demons and Shadows: The Ghostly Best of Robert Westall (1993) (a.k.a. The Best of Robert Westall: Volume One: Demons and Shadows, 1999)
- Shades of Darkness: More of the Ghostly Best Stories of Robert Westall (1994) (a.k.a. The Best of Robert Westall: Volume Two: Shades of Darkness, 1999)
- Christmas Spirit: Two Stories (1994)
- Shadows of War (2019)

=== Nonfiction ===
- Children of the Blitz (1985)
- The Making of Me (2006) (autobiographical)

== Adaptations ==
=== Radio ===
- Hitch-Hiker (first story in Break of Dark), BBC Radio 5 (1990)
- The Machine Gunners, BBC Radio 4 (2002)
- The Stones of Muncaster Cathedral, BBC Radio 4 (1996)
- The Wheatstone Pond, BBC Radio 4 (2002)
- Yaxley's Cat, BBC Radio 4

=== Television ===
- The Machine Gunners, BBC (1983)
- The Watch House, BBC (1988)

== Awards and honours ==
American Library Association 100 Best Books for Young Adults of the Last 25 years

- 1994: Blitzcat

American Library Association Best Fiction for Young Adults

- 1997: Gulf

Boston Globe–Horn Book Award runners-up

- 1977 Honor Book: The Machine Gunners
- 1982 Honor Book: The Scarecrows

Carnegie Medal

- 1975: The Machine Gunners
- 1981: The Scarecrows
- 1990 highly commended runner-up: The Kingdom by the Sea
- 1992 highly commended runner-up: Gulf
- 1978 commended runner-up: Devil on the Road

Dracula Society Children of the Night Award

- 1991: The Stones of Muncaster Cathedral

Guardian Children's Fiction Prize

- 1991: The Kingdom by the Sea

Nestlé Smarties Book Prize, age category 9–11 years

- 1989: Blitzcat

Sheffield Children's Book Award

- 1991: The Promise

== Papers ==
Robert Westall's papers, deposited between 2003 and 2010, are at Seven Stories, National Centre for Children's Books.
