= Fathom Five (novel) =

1979 novel by Robert Westall

- First edition
- Author: Robert Westall
- Language: English
- Genre: Children's Historical novel
- Set in: Garmouth, Great Britain
- Publisher: Macmillan
- Publication date: 1979
- Publication place: Great Britain
- Media type: print, paperback
- Pages: 258
- ISBN: 0333273850
- LC Class: Subclass PZ
- Preceded by: The Machine Gunners

Fathom Five is a 1979 novel by Robert Westall, and is the sequel to The Machine Gunners (1975). The book combines elements of spy story with the rites of a passage of teenage life. The characters are now older than in The Machine Gunners, and the themes are appropriate to their age. The transition from boy to man is one of the central aspects of the novel, and Chas is ultimately faced with a decision a mature adult would find daunting.

While The Machine Gunners tends to focus on the bombing and fear of invasion in 1941, Fathom Five fleshes out the world war. The ongoing effects of four years of rationing are covered (examples: Chas putting a hole in his trousers; the items brought by the different protagonists to a beach picnic; the Ministry of Food invitation to "Try our delicious Woolton pie"—a not-highly regarded meat-free pie). There is reference to the diaspora that has fled to Britain including: Scandinavian fishermen, the Maltese underclass, and Jewish pawnbrokers. It is through one of these that Chas encounters a widow of the Arctic convoys, which puts a distinctly human perspective on war. In addition the sheer banality of continuing war is alluded to, and a sense of late war fatigue which began to grip Britain at this time; reference is made to miners striking for better pay, and shipyard workers stealing iron rations from lifeboats, resulting in the deaths of torpedoed sailors.

As the plot develops, the author explores the social forces at work in 1943 Britain. Chas, the son of a gas fitter, embarks on a tentative relationship with Sheila, the daughter of a prominent local magistrate. The relationship between Chas and Sheila explores the hope and inexperience of first love. Upon meeting Sheila's mother, Chas is seduced by the prospect of "adults who you could discuss T. S. Eliot with", but the relationship is not approved of by Sheila's parents. In the end it is Chas's father who clarifies matters. The McGill family bookshelf consists of a shelf of Left Book Club titles including, we are led to understand, Orwell's Homage to Catalonia. Chas becomes an avid reader of these and starts to understand the society in which he lives.

The book is largely unsentimental. The Maltese of the Low Street are described in pungent detail as petty criminals and vice merchants although Chas does establish a friendship with some of them. This is a development of the theme of maturity and also Chas's growing sense of political identity informed by what he has read in his father's books. No mention is made of the heroic resistance that had so recently been underway on the island of Malta, and the reader is left with a lingering sense of unjustified mistrust about one character until late in the novel.
