= The Machine-Gunners =

1975 children's historical novel by Robert Westall

- First edition
- Author: Robert Westall
- Language: English
- Genre: Children's historical novel, war story
- Publisher: Macmillan
- Publication date: 18 September 1975
- Publication place: United Kingdom
- Media type: Print (hardcover; paperback)
- Pages: 189 pp (first edition)
- ISBN: 0333186443
- OCLC: 2186118
- LC Class: PZ7.W51953 Mac3
- Followed by: Fathom Five

The Machine-Gunners is a children's historical novel by Robert Westall, published by Macmillan in 1975. Set in northeastern England shortly after the Battle of Britain (February 1941), it features children who find a crashed German aircraft with a machine gun and ammunition; they build a fortress and capture and imprison a German gunner. The author also wrote a play based on the book, and others have adapted it for television and radio. A sequel, Fathom Five, set two years later, was published in 1979.

Westall won the annual Carnegie Medal from the Library Association, recognising the year's outstanding children's book by a British subject, and Machine-Gunners was named one of the top ten Medal-winning works for the 70th anniversary celebration in 2007, selected by a panel to compose the ballot for a public election of the all-time favourite.

== Plot summary ==
Set during the Second World War the story follows six children living in the fictional town of Garmouth which regularly suffers bombing raids by the German Luftwaffe. When Chas McGill finds a crashed German Heinkel He 111 bomber he removes a fully operational machine gun and over 2000 rounds of ammunition. With the help of his friends, Cem, Clogger, Carrot Juice, Audrey and Nicky they set up their own den called "Fortress Caporetto", named after a World War I battle in which Chas's grandfather fought.

Later a bomb lands on Nicky's house and he is presumed dead but actually survives and hides in the fortress, where he is found by the gang. After this, only his friends know he is alive and Clogger leaves his home and joins him.

During an attack by a Bf 110 fighter, the children fire their gun at the plane. They miss but the plane is shot down. The pilot is killed but the rear gunner, Rudi Gerlath, bails out. He discovers the children's hidden fortress and is promptly detained by the children, who take his pistol, even though their machine gun is damaged and inoperable.

The children do not hand the German over to the authorities, but keep him prisoner at their fort. The children bribe the German with the offer of a boat if he will repair their machine gun. He agrees and mends it before being taken to the dock where he rows off. The same night the church bells ring signalling a German invasion. The children hurry to the fortress but do not see anything; it was a false alarm. Out at sea, Rudi finds he does not have the strength to row to German-occupied Norway and is forced back to England and rejoins the children at the fortress.

The next day it is realised that the children are missing, and some Polish soldiers are drafted in to look for them. The children, on hearing troops speak in a foreign language, open fire on them with the gun, believing they are a German invasion force. The children are soon overpowered, however, and forced to surrender. In the chaos, Clogger shoots and wounds Rudi with his own Luger pistol.

The very well-made fortress is surrendered to the Home Guard, then Clogger and Nicky are taken to a children's home while the other children are handed over to their parents.

== Adaptations ==
The Machine-Gunners was dramatised as a BBC television serial in 1983, with scripts written by William Corlett. It was further adapted as a ten-episode drama for BBC Radio 4 by the writer Ivan Jones in 2002.

A new adaptation by Ali Taylor was commissioned by the Imperial War Museum and was performed at the Polka Theatre, London in 2011. The play was directed by Adam Penford and starred Chris Coxon, David Kirkbride, Claire Sundin, Scott Turnbull, Matthew Brown and Michael Imerson. This adaptation was published by Nick Hern Books in 2012.

== See also ==
Awards
Preceded by The Stronghold	Carnegie Medal recipient 1975	Succeeded by Thunder and Lightnings
