= The Watch House =

1977 novel by Robert Westall

- First edition (publ. Macmillan)
- Author: Robert Westall
- Language: English
- Publication date: 1977

The Watch House is a 1977 fiction book by Robert Westall. The main story is about a teenager called Anne, who is left to spend the summer with her mother's old nanny. While there she explores the watch house, writes a guidebook for the watch house and is haunted by a ghost. It is split up into three parts.

== Reprintings ==
A hardback edition was printed in May 2000. It was the 10th edition available. It is used as an education book by many schools around the world.
