= Tail gunner =

Military flight crew member

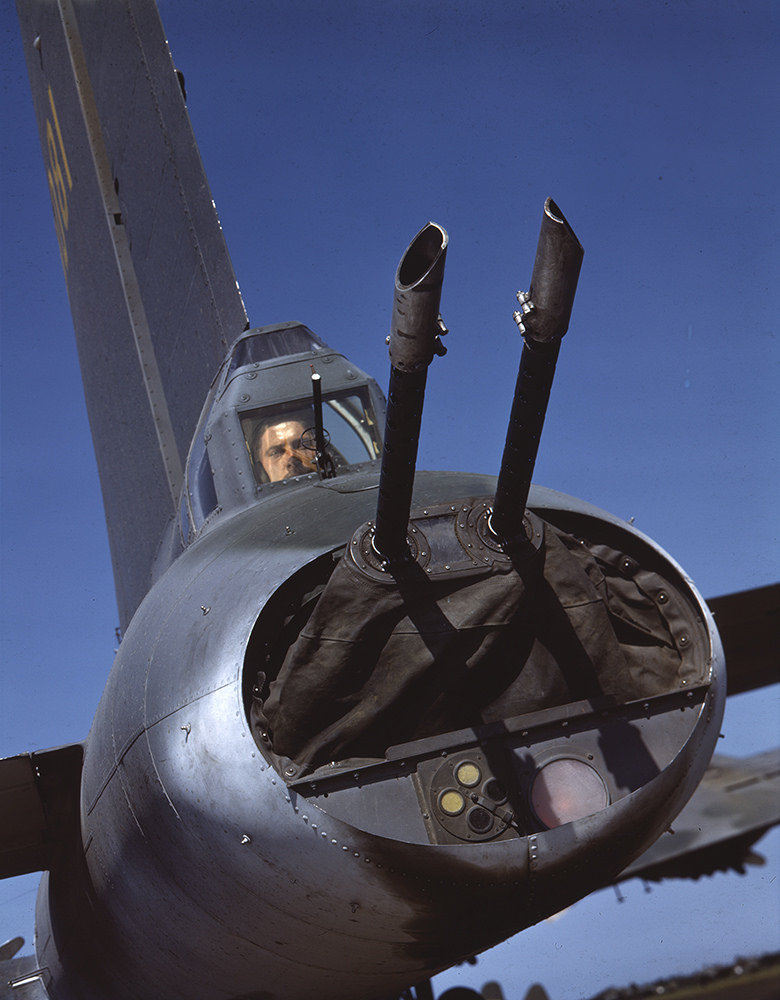
Tail gunner in a USAAF B-17 Flying Fortress, 1943

A tail gunner or rear gunner is a crewman on a military aircraft who functions as a gunner defending against enemy fighter attacks from the rear, or "tail", of the plane.

The tail gunner operates a flexible machine gun or autocannon emplacement in the tail end of the aircraft with an unobstructed view toward the rear of the aircraft. While the term tail gunner is usually associated with a crewman inside a gun turret, the first tail guns were operated from open apertures within the aircraft's fuselage, such as the Scarff ring mechanism used in the British Handley Page V/1500, which was introduced during latter months of the First World War. Increasingly capable tail gunner positions were developed during the interwar period and the Second World War, resulting in the emergence of the powered turret and fire control systems incorporating radar guidance. In particularly advanced tail gunner arrangements, the tail armament may be operated by remote control from another part of the aircraft, such as the American Boeing B-52 Stratofortress, a strategic bomber first introduced during 1955.

== History ==
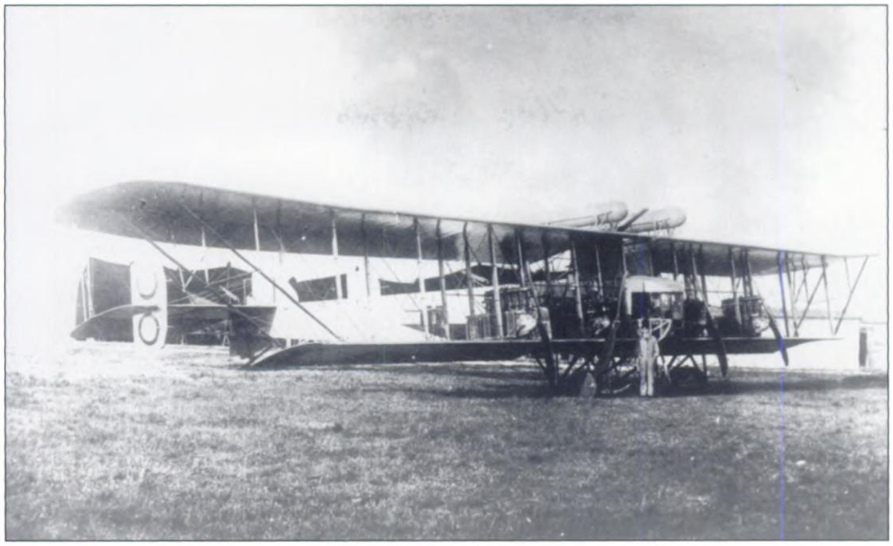
The Russian Sikorsky Ilya Muromets (model S-25 variant Geh-2, from March 1916) was the first aircraft equipped with a tail gun position

The first aircraft to ever have incorporated a tail gunner position was the Sikorsky Ilya Muromets bomber, which became active during the First World War and the last years of the Russian Empire. The Ilya Muromets prototype flew for the first time in 1913, with no guns on board and no rear position for the crew. When the war broke out, in 1914, only a few Ilya Muromets aircraft had been built, but increasing numbers were required because of the war effort. After having entered the mass-production phase and having seen combat all along the first year of war against the fighter planes of the German Empire, a rear-defending position appeared to the Imperial Russian Air Service to be increasingly vital to protect both the plane and its crewmen. Such an arrangement, during March 1916, saw light of day on the model S-25 (variant Geh-2) of the Sikorsky Ilya Muromets bomber plane. This aircraft was the first in history to include on its ending tail area a gunner position. Mass-production of Ilya Muromets bomber commenced, with the final example being completed in 1918, by which time in excess of 80 aircraft had been reportedly completed. Those Ilya Muromets that served after the Russian Revolution were inducted into the Soviet Air Forces.

Another example of a First World War-era aircraft equipped with a tail gunner position was the British Handley Page V/1500. It was specifically developed as a heavy bomber by Handley Page, who designed a relatively large four-engined biplane for the era; it was reportedly capable of bombing Berlin from bases in East Anglia. However, the type did not enter service until the very end of the war, during the months of October and November 1918, and thus never saw any kind of combat action. The type did see use in subsequent conflicts, including a pivotal role in ending the Third Anglo-Afghan War, flying from Risalpur to Kabul to drop its payload of four 112 lb (51 kg) bombs and 16 20 lb (10 kg) bombs on the city and the royal palace, reportedly contributing to the Afghans' speedy surrender.

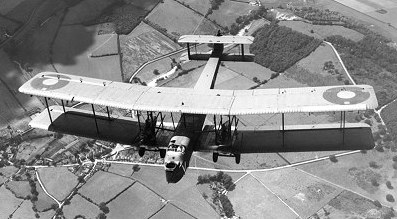
Vickers Virginia in flight

Throughout the interwar period, various new military aircraft were introduced that featured a gunner position on their tails; examples included the British Vickers Virginia, introduced to service in 1924, and the Japanese flying boat Kawanishi H3K (developed from the Short Rangoon), brought into service during 1930. One of the first aircraft to operate a fully enclosed tail gun turret was the British Armstrong Whitworth Whitley. Performing its first flight during 1936, the Whitley entered service with the RAF, remaining in service until the closing months of the Second World War. The tail gunner position of the Whitley would be revised on later-built models, adopting a more powerful Nash & Thompson power-operated turret mounting four Browning machine guns.

Across the overall history of its use in combat, the tail gunner was most active during the Second World War. For almost every aircraft model in which it was fitted, the tail gun position was constituted of an enclosed compartment inhabited by the gunner. During the Second World War, this extreme tail compartment typically conformed to the inside fixed gunner configuration, in which the gunner operated the articulated mount of autocannon or machine gun fire (usually one or two weapons); examples of aircraft such fitted include the Japanese Mitsubishi G4M bomber (which had one Oerlikon 20 mm autocannon), and the American B-17 and B-29 bombers (which were fitted with a mount of two 0.50 Browning M2 machine guns).

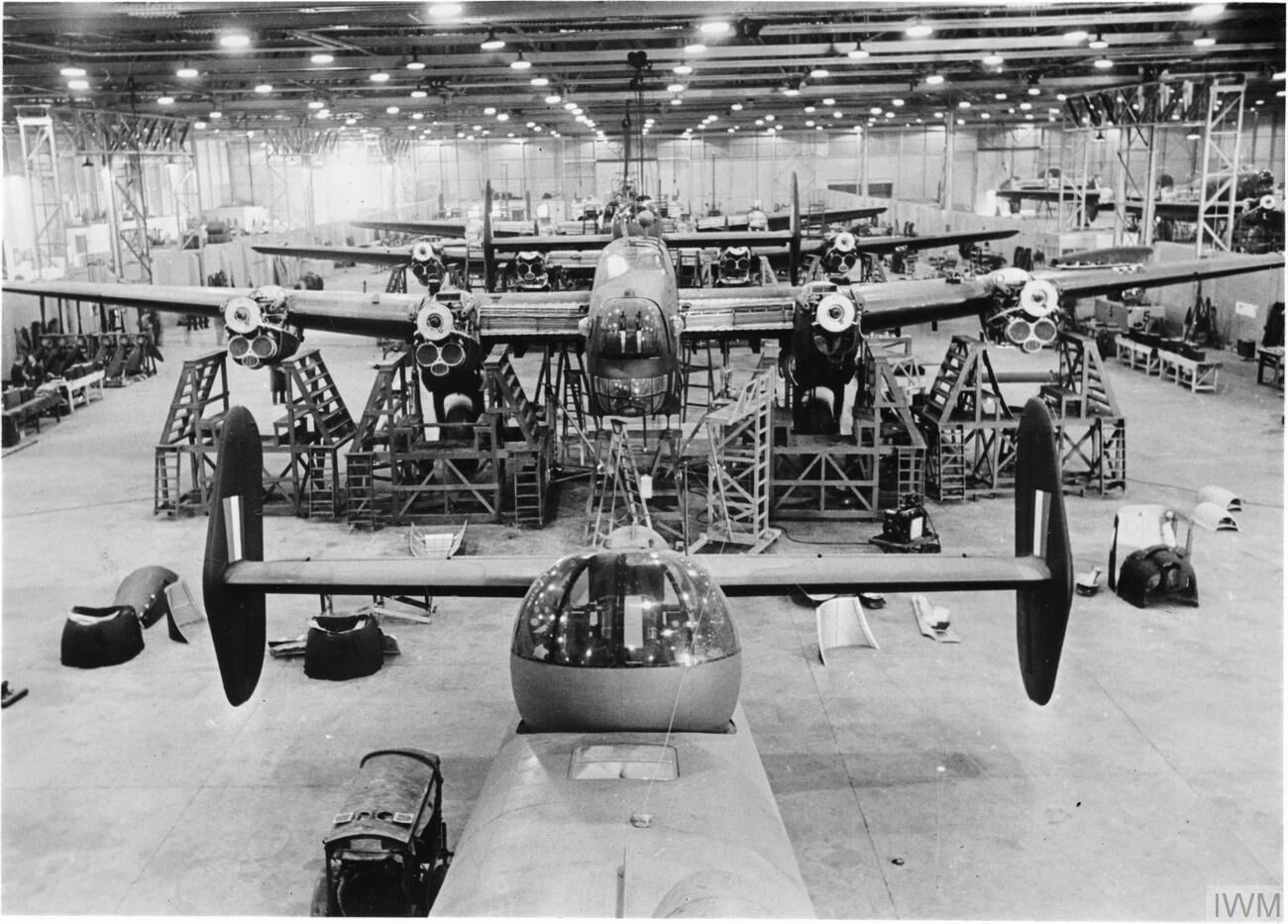
A row of Halifax bombers under assembly, 1942. Note the rounded turret position towards the end of the tail

An alternative arrangement in the form of the hydraulically or electrically powered and fully enclosed gun turret. This configuration typically rotated horizontally and mounting one, two or more automatic firearms; aircraft that featured such tail guns include the later-built variants of the American B-24 bomber (various turret models were used, all equipped with two 0.50 Browning M2), and several British bombers, including the Avro Lancaster (outfitted with a Nash & Thompson FN-20 turret with four Browning .303 Mark II machine guns), and the Handley Page Halifax (featuring a Boulton & Paul Type E Mk III turret that also mounted four 0.50 Browning M2s).

During the closing years of the conflict, the American B-29 bombers were equipped with a tail gun position in which the gunner still had a direct view on his target while operating his synchronized weapons, but some other gun positions of this particular model of Boeing bomber were, for the first time in an aircraft, operated from other parts of the plane, each one spotting the target by means of a periscopic viewing system. Following the end of the conflict, the postwar period saw more and more subsequent tail gun positions in aircraft inherited this viewing and sight method, ending afterwards with added radar sights and radar targeting systems, early testing of which had occurred during the Second World War; one such example was the radar-aimed FN121 turret that was fitted to some Lancaster and Halifax bombers was introduced during 1944.

Another phenomenon that heavily affected the tail gunner's future came in the form of aircraft such as the de Havilland Mosquito. While many aviation firms entered heavy designs with new high-powered engines and multiple defensive turrets, such as the Avro Manchester and Halifax bombers, de Havilland promoted the concept of a compact bomber that lacked defensive turrets and instead relied upon its speed. Despite pressure by the Air Ministry to arm their proposal, de Havilland made no design changes and built the Mosquito as envisaged. When the type commenced introduction 1941, the aircraft was one of the fastest operational aircraft in the world. In practice, the Mosquito proved its effectiveness; despite an initially high loss rate, the bomber variants ended the war with the lowest recorded losses of any aircraft in RAF Bomber Command service. Due to its success, aspects such as speed and altitude performance were often prioritised over defensive armaments on future bomber aircraft, such as the widely procured jet-powered English Electric Canberra.

The tail gunner was last heavily used in combat during the Vietnam War on the United States Air Force's (USAF) large bombers. By this point, the position had become largely obsolete due to advancements in long-range air combat weapons such as air-to-air missiles, as well as modern detection and countermeasures against such armaments. On 18 December 1972, during Operation Linebacker II, USAF B-52 Stratofortresses of the Strategic Air Command conducted a major bombing campaign against North Vietnam. As the bombers approached the target, they would be heavily engaged by North Vietnamese anti-aircraft units, firing barrages of Surface-to-air missiles (SAMs) that exploded around the Stratofortresses. After completing its bombing run, Stratofortress Brown III was warned of Vietnam People's Air Force (NVAF-North Vietnamese Air Force) MiGs. Brown III's tail gunner, SSGT Samuel O. Turner, shot down a MiG-21 interceptor, becoming the first tail gunner to shoot down an enemy aircraft since the Korean War.

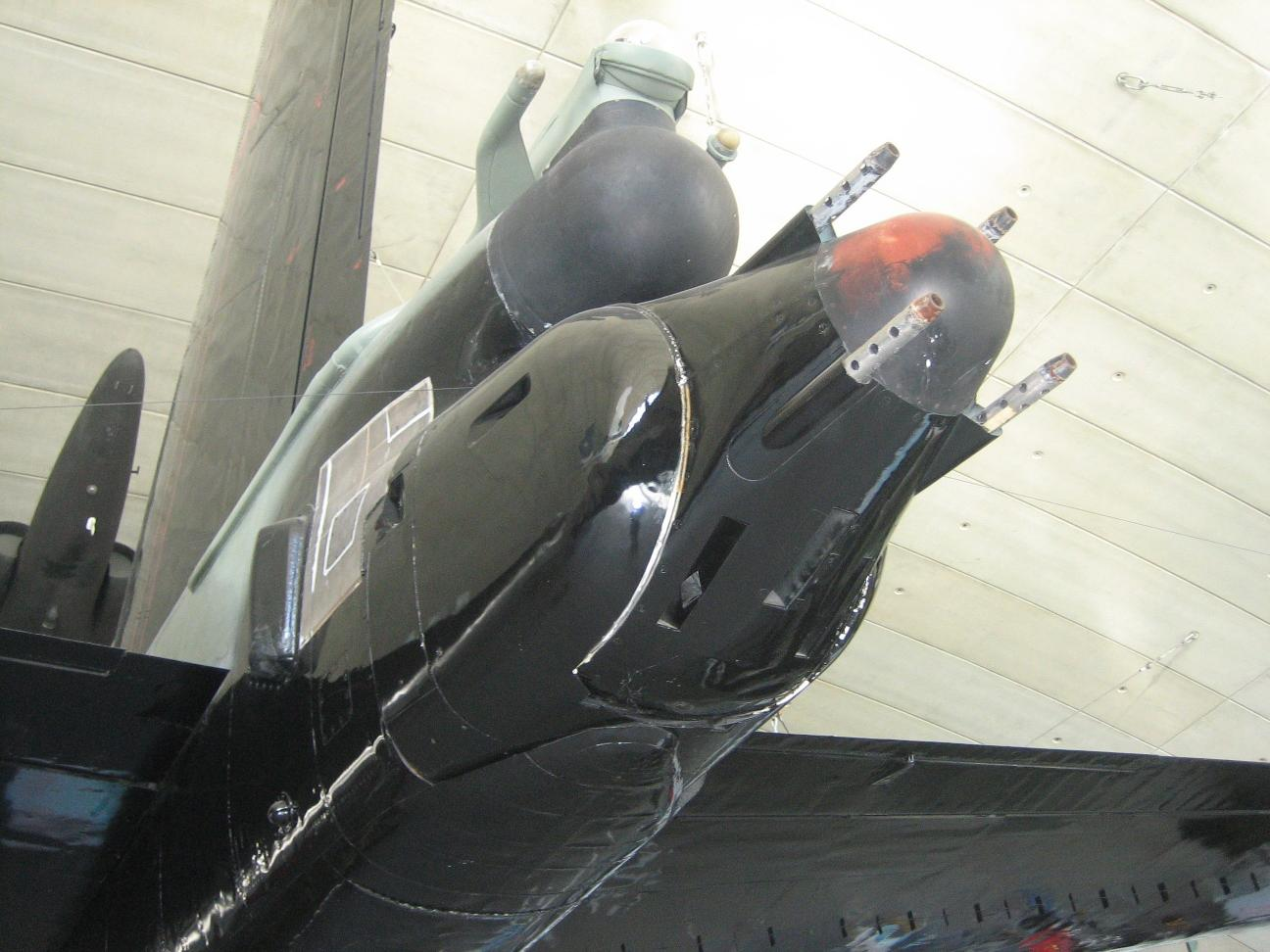
The tail turret on the B-52D at the Imperial War Museum Duxford (2006)

On 24 December 1972, during the same bombing campaign, B-52 Stratofortress Diamond Lil was attacking railroad yards at Thái Nguyên when the tail gunner detected a MiG-21 8 miles (13 km) away climbing to intercept. The aircraft took evasive action and dropped chaff and flares while the gunner fired around 800 rounds from 2,000 yards (1,800 m), causing the MiG-21 to fall, on fire. That incident was the last tail gunner to shoot down an enemy aircraft with machine guns during wartime.

The final combat usage of tail gunners by the United States Air Force occurred in 1991, during the Gulf War. During the conflict, a missile struck a B-52 by locking onto the tail gunner's radar; it is disputed whether or not it was unintentional friendly fire by an F-4 Phantom, or if an Iraqi MiG-29 had successfully fired upon the aircraft. The B-52 escaped heavy damage, but the incident motivated the decision to discontinue use of the position throughout the fleet. On 1 October 1991, Master Sergeant Tom Lindsey became the last USAF tail gunner to serve on a B-52 sortie.

== Operational practices ==
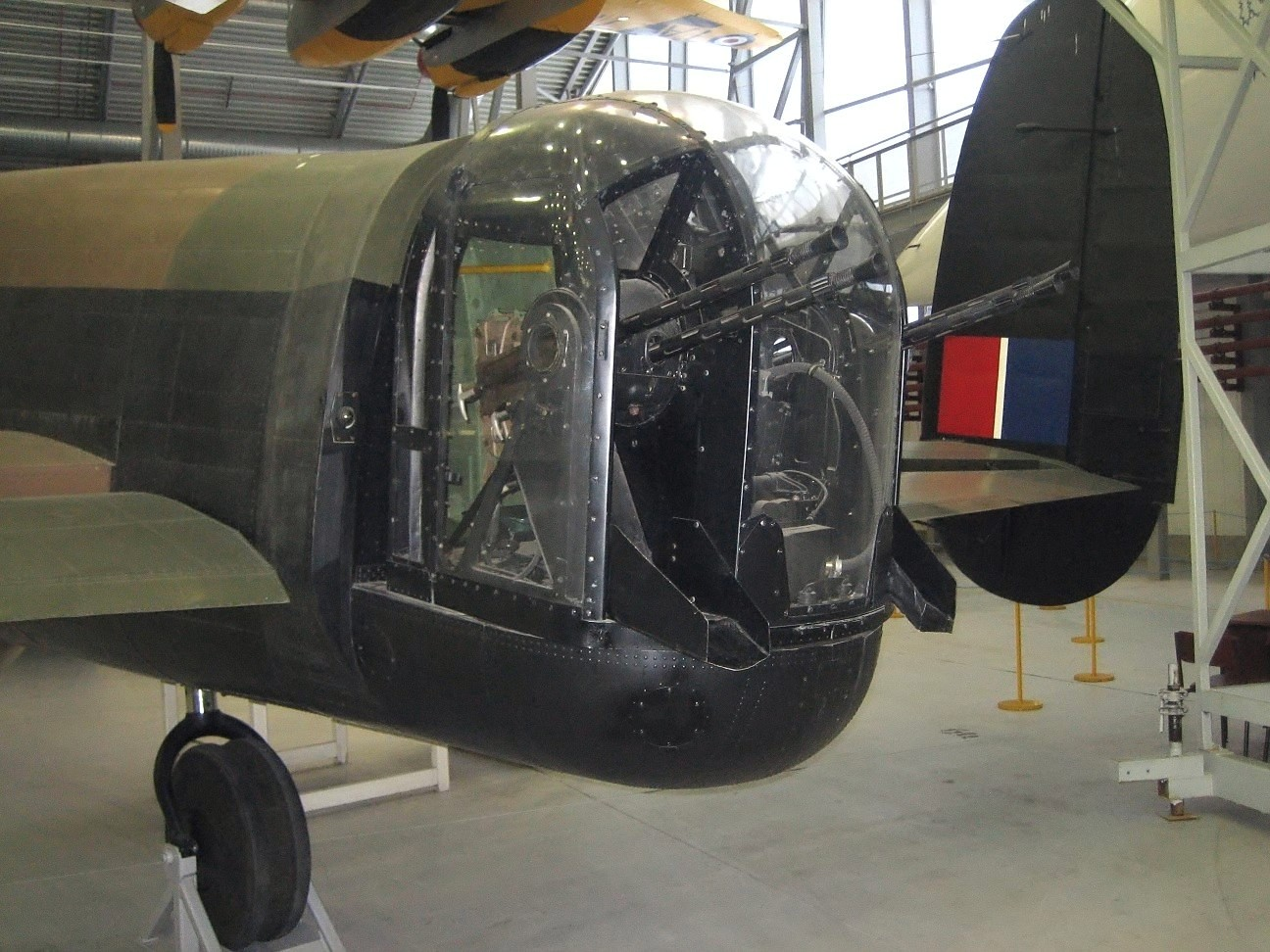
A Nash & Thompson FN-20 turret fitted to an Avro Lancaster, Imperial War Museum Duxford (2006)

The purpose of the tail gunner was principally to act as a lookout for attacking enemy fighters, particularly upon British bombers operating at nighttime. As these aircraft operated individually instead of being part of a bombing formation, the bombers' first reaction to an attacking night fighter was to engage in radical evasive maneuvers such as a corkscrew roll; firing guns in defense was of secondary importance. The British slang term for tail gunners was "Tail-end Charlies", while in the Luftwaffe they were called Heckschwein ("tail-end pigs").

Both the specific armament and arrangement of the tail gun varied considerably between countries. During the Second World War, the majority of United States Army Air Forces heavy bomber aircraft, such as the Boeing B-17 Flying Fortress and Boeing B-29 Superfortress, used a fixed gunner position with the guns themselves in a separate mounting covering an approximately 90-degree rear arc. Typical armament was two 0.50 inch M2 Browning machine guns. In contrast, Royal Air Force heavy bombers, such as the Avro Lancaster and Handley Page Halifax, used a powered turret capable of 180-degree rotation containing the tail gunner and four 0.303 inch Browning machine guns. A similar arrangement was used in the American B-24 Liberator heavy bomber (but with two 0.50 inch heavy machine guns.) Most British turrets were manufactured by two companies Nash & Thompson and Boulton & Paul Ltd, it was common for the same turret model to be fitted to a number of different aircraft.

The majority of wartime German and Italian aircraft, including smaller ground attack aircraft and dive bombers, lacked a tail gunner position; instead, there was commonly a dorsal gun fitted behind the cockpit or ventral gun along the belly of the aircraft replaced the tail gunner position covering the tail. This position was blocked by the fuselage but allowed better weight distribution. In the autumn of 1944, the British began deploying Lancasters fitted with the Automatic Gun-Laying Turret, which was fitted with a 3 GHz (9.1 cm) radar. The image from the radar's cathode ray tube was projected onto the turret's gunsight, allowing the gunner to fire on targets in complete darkness, with corrections for lead and bullet drop being automatically computed. Due to it having the frequency that it did, it might potentially be spotted by any Luftwaffe night fighter fitted with the Funk-Gerät 350 Naxos radar detection system, which was primarily used to home in on the earlier H2S bombing radar system's emissions.

One important development for the Luftwaffe that never made it onto its larger night fighters or strategic bomber designs would have been the Borsig firm's "quadmount", hydraulically powered Hecklafette HL 131V manned tail turret, fitted with a quartet of the firm's own MG 131 machine guns. Prototype examples of the HL 131V were trialed in the late spring and summer of 1943 on a trio of He 177A-3 examples set aside as the V32 through V34 prototypes. This innovative design never made it to production status, only existing as a series of engineering department mockups with Heinkel and Junkers, among others (for their aircraft designs that were intended to mount them) and as the aforementioned working prototypes. The HL 131V turret's design was advanced for a German-origin manned emplacement, using hydraulic drive to both elevate the turret's side-mount gunmount elevation units through a +/- 60º vertical arc either side of level, with a capability for horizontal traverse (of the entire turret) of some 100º to either side, all at a top traverse angular speed of 60º per second.

== List of aircraft with tail gun positions ==
=== France ===
- Breguet Br.521 Bizerte – maritime patrol flying boat

=== Germany ===
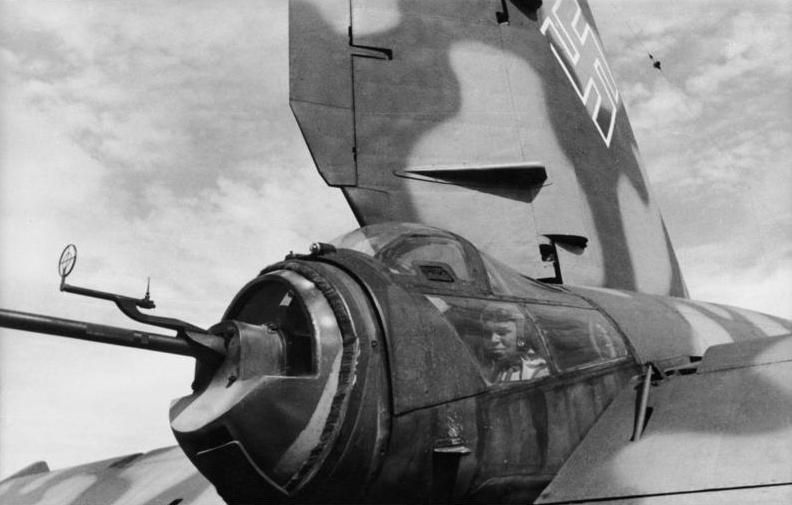
He 177 A-5 tail gun position, with MG 151 cannon and bulged upper glazing for upright gunner's seating

- Blohm und Voss BV 238 – transport flying boat (some versions only)
- Dornier Do 24 – maritime patrol flying boat
- Gotha Go 242 – transport
- Junkers Ju 290 – long range patrol/transport
- Heinkel He 177 – heavy bomber

=== Japan ===
- Kawanishi H3K – patrol flying boat (open tail gunner position)
- Kawanishi H6K – patrol flying boat (closed gun turret position, as all the following)
- Kawanishi H8K – patrol flying boat
- Mitsubishi G4M – medium bomber
- Mitsubishi Ki-67 – medium bomber
- Nakajima G8N – heavy bomber
- Yokosuka H5Y – patrol flying boat

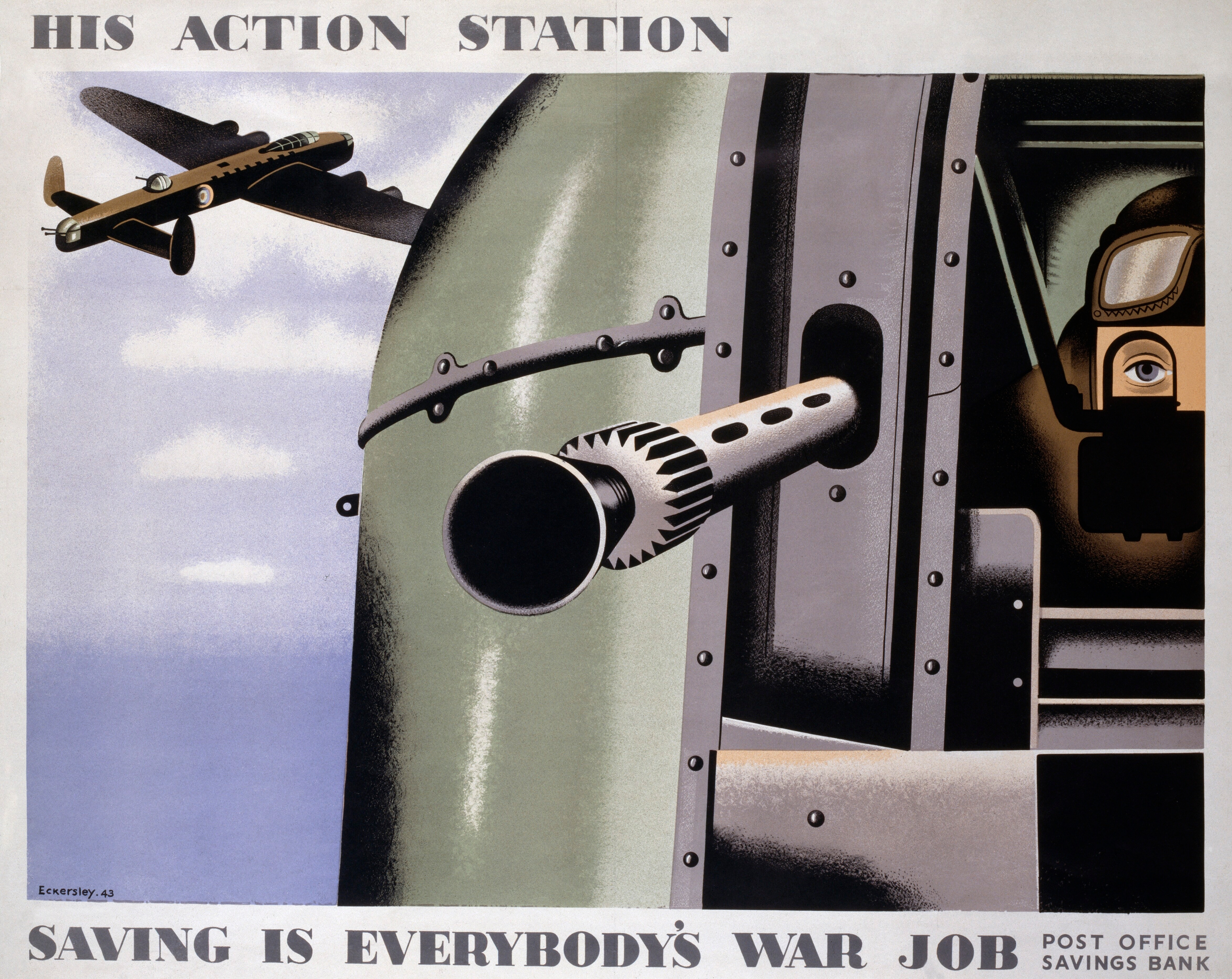
British Second World War poster depicting the tail gunner of an Avro Lancaster bomber

=== Netherlands ===
- Fokker T.V

=== United Kingdom ===
- Armstrong Whitworth Whitley (introduced 1937) – medium bomber; initially equipped with a manually operated tail turret featuring a single Lewis gun, it successively received 2- and then 4-gun Nash & Thompson turrets.
- Avro Lancaster (introduced 1942) – heavy bomber; 4-gun Nash & Thompson tail turrets: some late-war aircraft received Village Inn automatic radar aiming and others were fitted with a Rose turret.
- Avro Manchester (introduced 1940) – heavy twin engine bomber.
- Blackburn Iris (introduced 1929) – patrol flying boat; Lewis guns on a Scarff ring in the extreme tail
- Handley Page Halifax (introduced 1940) – heavy bomber; 4-gun Boulton Paul tail turret
- Handley Page V/1500 (introduced 1918) – heavy bomber; Lewis guns on a Scarff ring in the extreme tail
- Hawker Siddeley P.1184-16 Dash 18 - prototype V/STOL; tail gunner cockpit for aiming Taildog missiles
- Short Singapore (introduced 1935) – patrol flying boat; Lewis guns on a Scarff ring in the extreme tail
- Supermarine Stranraer (introduced 1937) – patrol flying boat
- Short Stirling (introduced 1940) – heavy bomber; 4 x 0.303 in (7.7 mm) Browning machine guns in the extreme tail turret
- Short Sunderland (introduced 1938) – maritime patrol and anti-submarine flying boat; 4-gun Nash & Thompson tail turret
- Vickers Virginia (introduced 1924) – – heavy bomber; Lewis guns on a Scarff ring in the extreme tail
- Vickers Wellington- (introduced 1938) medium bomber fitted with two Browning M1919s in the tail turret
- Vickers Windsor (first flew 1943) – prototype heavy bomber; tail gun aiming position controlling barbette-mounted Hispano 20 mm cannon in the rear of the engine nacelles.

=== United States ===
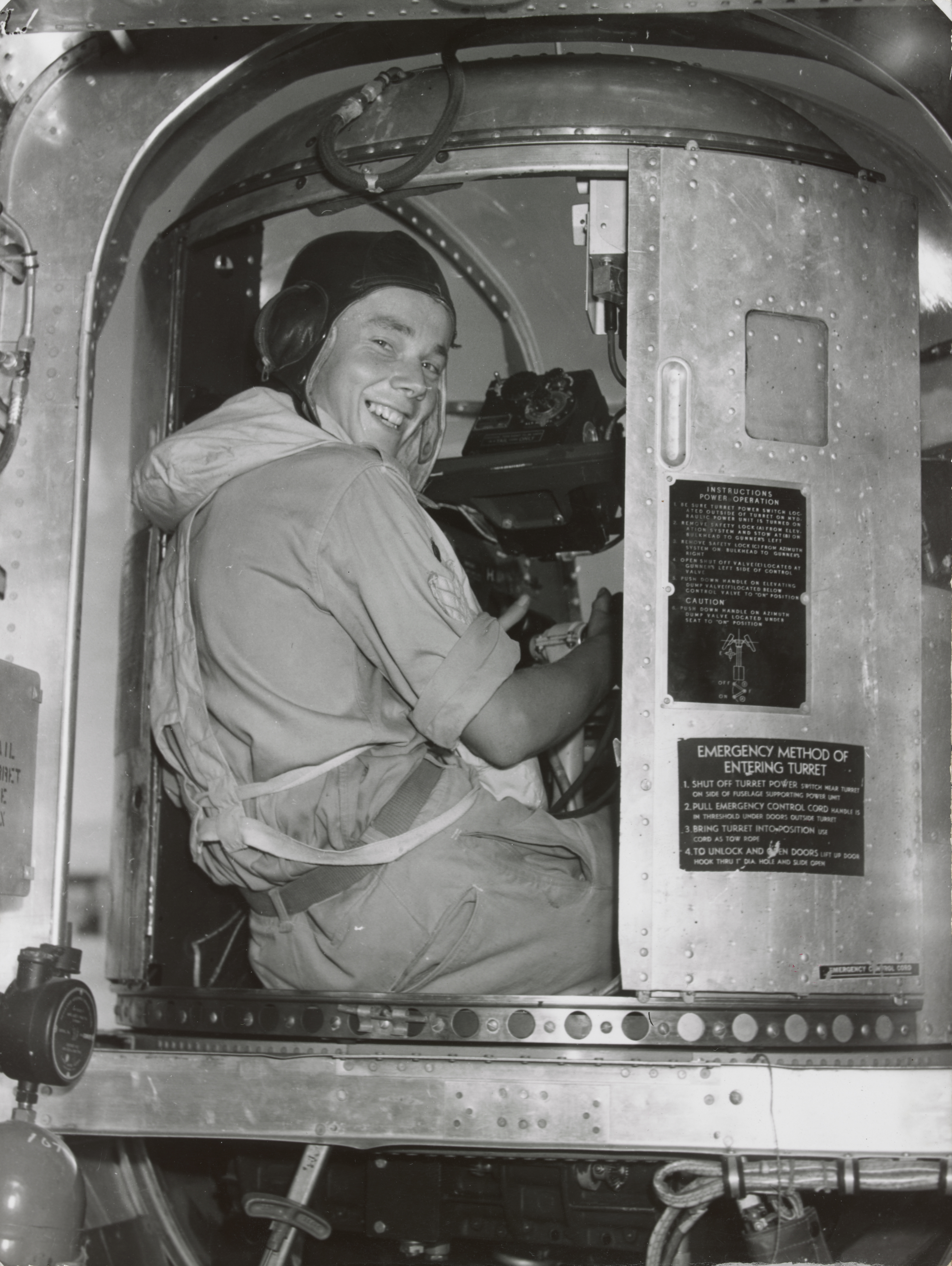
Tail gunner in an RAF B-24 Liberator

- Boeing B-17 Flying Fortress – heavy bomber; fixed tailgun position from the B-17E version onwards
- Boeing B-29 Superfortress – heavy bomber
- Boeing B-47 Stratojet – Cold War heavy bomber
- Boeing B-50 Superfortress – Cold War heavy bomber
- Boeing B-52 Stratofortress – Cold War heavy bomber
- Consolidated B-24 Liberator – heavy bomber;
- Convair B-36 Peacemaker – Cold War heavy bomber
- Convair B-58 Hustler – Cold War supersonic bomber
- Douglas XB-19 – heavy bomber
- Douglas B-23 Dragon – medium bomber;
- Lockheed P2V-4 Neptune – Antisubmarine
- Martin B-26 Marauder – medium bomber
- North American B-25 Mitchell – medium bomber

=== USSR/Russia ===
- Sikorsky S-25 Ilya Muromets
- Antonov An-12
- Ilyushin Il-28
- Ilyushin Il-40
- Ilyushin Il-102
- Ilyushin Il-76
- Myasishchev M-4
- Petlyakov Pe-8
- Tupolev Tu-4
- Tupolev Tu-14
- Tupolev Tu-16
- Tupolev Tu-22
- Tupolev Tu-22M
- Tupolev Tu-95/Tu-142

== See also ==
=== Prominent tail gunners ===
- Joseph McCarthy ("Tail-gunner Joe")
- Wallace McIntosh

=== Other kinds of air gunners ===
- Dorsal gunner
- Ventral gunner
- Nose gunner

=== Helicopters and Rotorcraft ===
- Door gunner
