= Nash & Thompson =

British engineering firm

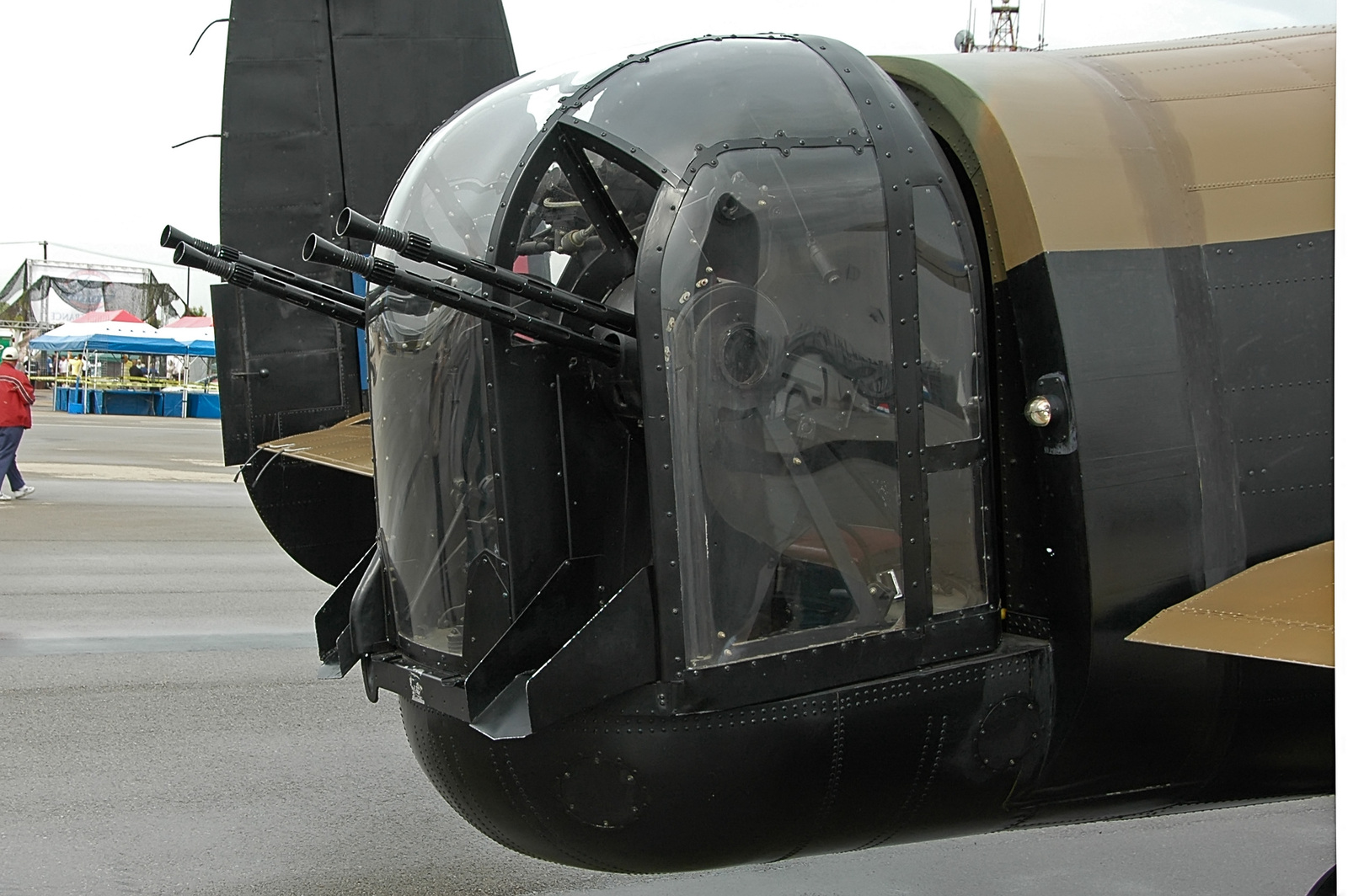
The FN-20 4-gun tail turret on an Avro Lancaster

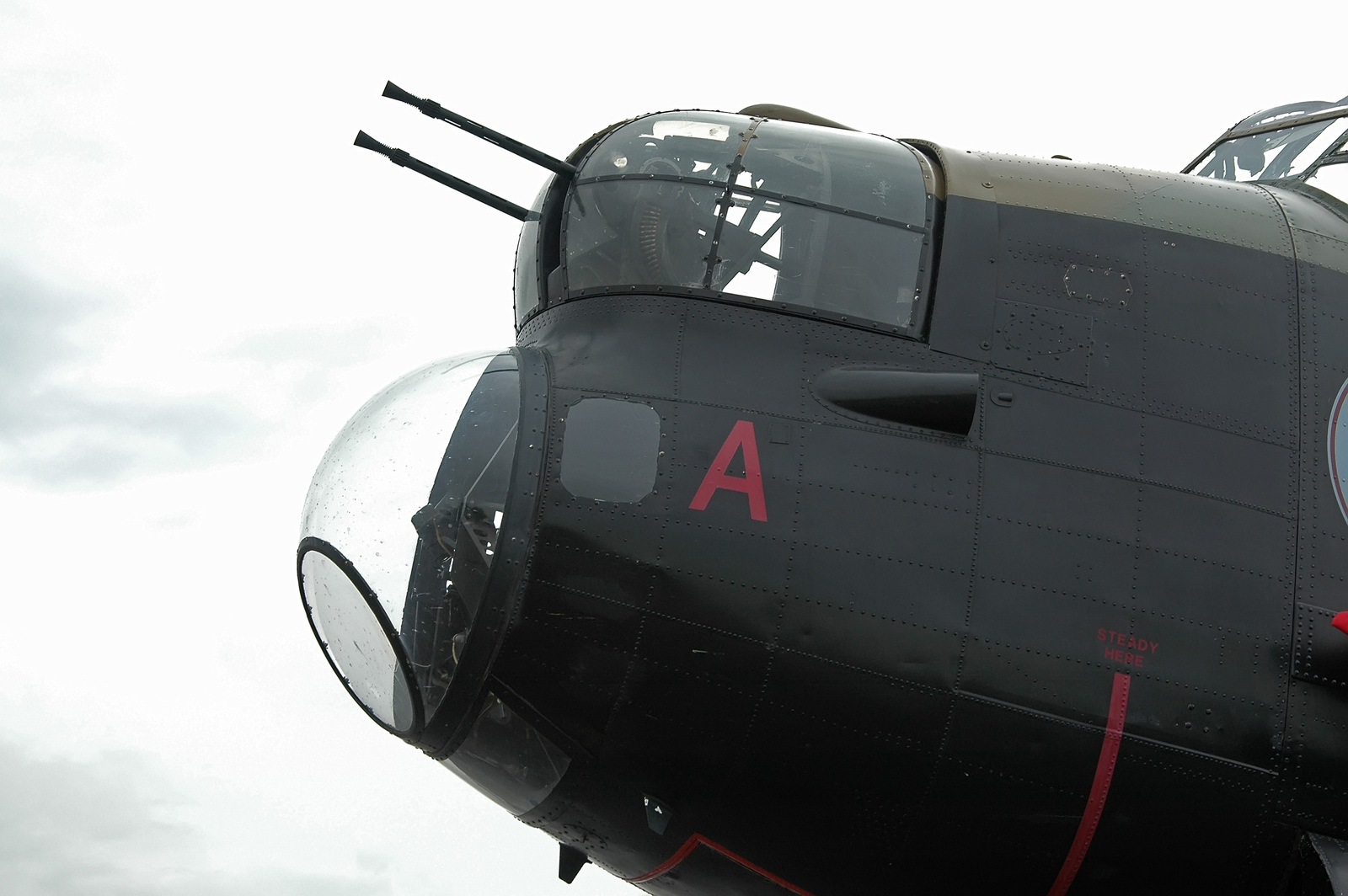
FN-5 2-gun nose turret on a Lancaster

Nash & Thompson was a British engineering firm that developed and produced hydraulically operated gun turrets for aircraft. As part of Parnall Aircraft it was also an important manufacturer of hydraulic-powered radar scanners used on radar systems such as H2S and AI Mark VIII.

Nash & Thompson also designed the hydraulically-powered turret traversing systems that were used in British Cruiser tanks from the A9 - the first tank with a powered turret traverse - through to the Cromwell.

== History ==
Nash & Thompson was established in 1929 at Kingston upon Thames by business partners Archibald Goodman Frazer Nash and Esmonde Grattan Thompson

Nash & Thompson developed the hydraulic gun turrets that Frazer-Nash invented and his designs were consequently numbered in a series prefixed with "FN".

=== Parnall Aircraft ===
In May 1935 Parnall Aircraft was formed taking over the George Parnall & Company site at Yate which gave them a skilled workforce, and the Hendy Aircraft Company. Thompson was the managing director and Frazer Nash technical director. Production was to be at Yate while development remained at Tolworth.

The company's major competition in the UK at the time was from Boulton & Paul, which had licensed the designs of the French company S.A.M.M. (Societe d'Application des Machines Motrices). The FN turrets used hydraulic power produced by the aircraft's engine: the BP designs used individual hydraulic pumps for each turret supplied from the aircraft's 24-volt electrical system. Bristol also became a major builder of turrets for British aircraft in the following years.

Initially other companies such as Vickers and Handley Page took FN control units for fitting in their own turret designs.

The importance of Parnall at Yate to British aircraft production was such that two bomb attacks by the Luftwaffe were made on it, the first on 27 February 1941 by KG27's most experienced crew which resulted in 46 deaths and loss of production drawings. In response production was dispersed.

Over the course of the war the company workforce reached 8,000 engaged on design, production and maintenance and support. At the end of the war, under the chairmanship of the Earl of Limerick, Parnall left the aircraft industry reducing to 1,000 employees at Yate.

== Products ==
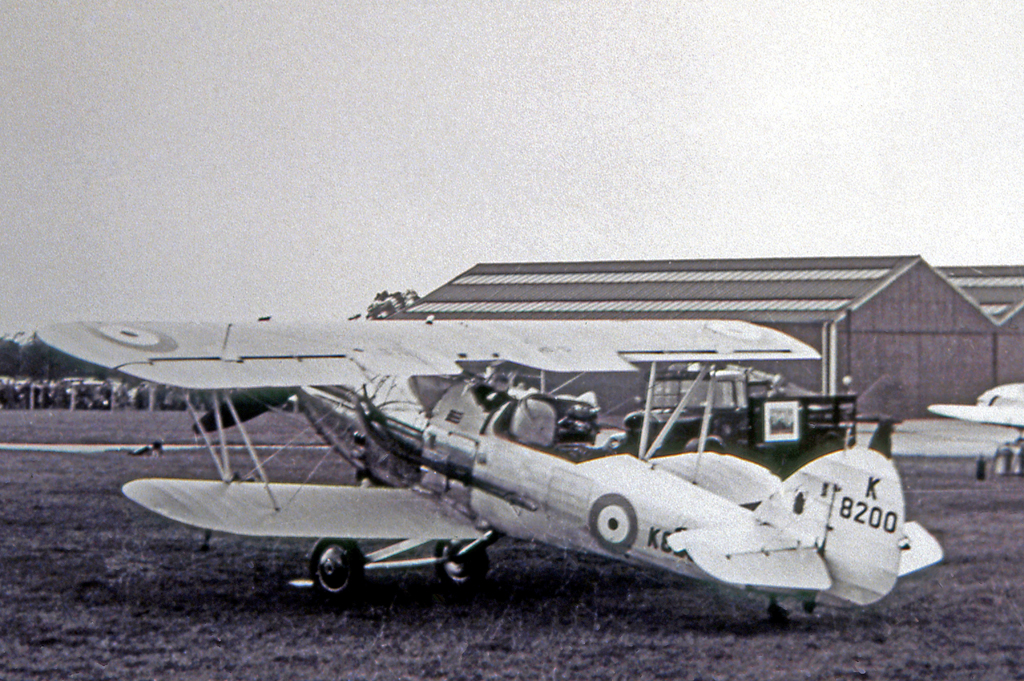
Boulton & Paul built Hawker "Turret" Demon I K8200 June 1938, showing the FN 1 "lobster back" windshield

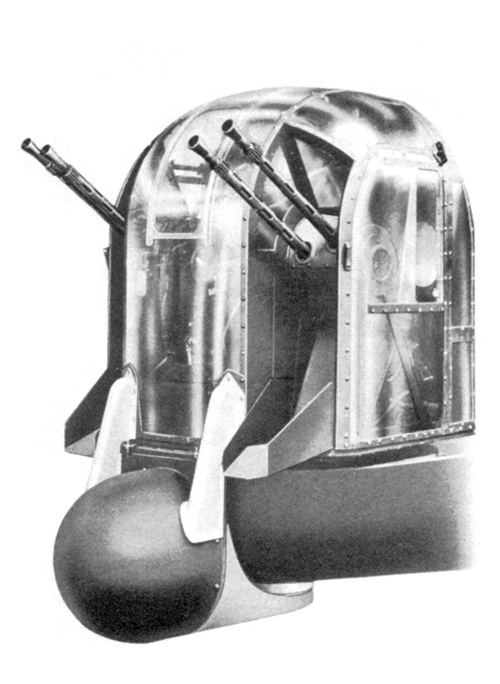
FN 121 turret incorporating the Village Inn system, as fitted on a Lancaster.

Nash & Thompson built a wide range of turrets for aircraft. All were powered hydraulically and carried 0.303-inch (7.7 mm) Vickers K or Browning machine guns, except where noted. Many were built by Parnall Aircraft with which they merged in 1935.

- FN 1 – "lobster back" partially enclosed turret for Hawker Demon
- FN 4A – four-gun rear turret
- FN 5 – two-gun nose turret on Avro Manchester, Short Stirling and Vickers Wellington
- FN 5A – two-gun nose turret on Avro Lancaster
- FN 7 – two-gun dorsal turret on Blackburn Botha, Manchester, Short Sunderland, Stirling
- FN 9 – two-gun retractable "dustbin" ventral turret on Wellington, rarely fitted.
- FN 10 – two-gun tail turret on early-model Wellington and Armstrong Whitworth Whitley
- FN 11 – two-gun retractable nose turret in Sunderland
- FN 13 – four-gun tail turret in Sunderland
- FN 16 – single Vickers 'K' gun front turret in Whitley
- FN 17 – two-gun retractable "dustbin" ventral turret on Whitley, rarely used
- FN 20 – four-gun tail turret on Lancaster, Wellington, Stirling and Whitley
- FN 21A – two-gun retractable "dustbin" ventral turret on Manchester, rarely used
- FN 25 – two-gun retractable "dustbin" ventral turret for the Wellington I based on the FN 17
- FN 50 – two-gun dorsal turret ("Centre Gun Turret") on Lancaster, late-model Stirling
- FN 51 – two-gun dorsal turret on early-model Handley Page Halifax
- FN 54 – two-gun rearward firing chin turret on Bristol Blenheim Mk.IV and Bristol Beaufort
- FN 64 – two-gun ventral turret ("Under Gun Turret") on Lancaster with periscopic sight, rarely fitted
- FN.70 - planned pressurised rear turret for high-altitude Wellington VI
- FN 77 – retractable ventral turret fitted with Leigh Light for the Wellington and Warwick based on the FN 25
- FN 82 – two-gun (0.5 inch (12.7 mm) Browning) tail turret on late-model Lancaster
- FN 120 – four-gun tail turret; refinement of the FN 20 weighing 40 lb (18 kg) less; used on late-model Lancaster and Wellington
- FN 121 – four-gun tail Automatic Gun Laying Turret on late-model Lancaster fitted with Village Inn automatic gun laying radar and fire control (ALGR); also used without AGLR on Wellington and Warwick
- FN 150 – an improved two-gun dorsal turret, based on the FN 50, and fitted to many Lancasters

== See also ==
- Rose turret
