= Door gunner =

Role in military helicopters

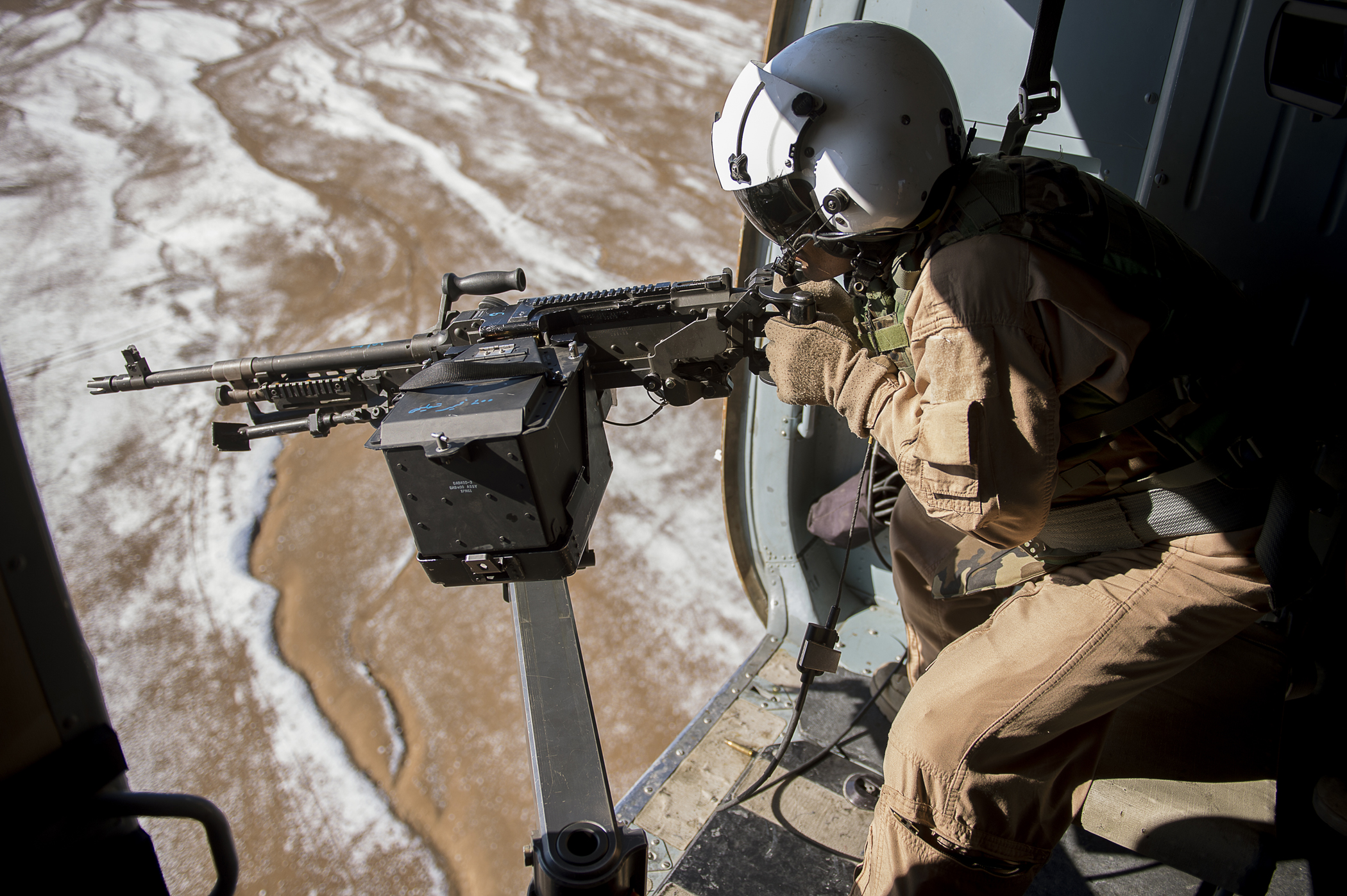
A door gunner operating the 7.62 GPMG over Kandahar Province, Afghanistan

A door gunner is a crewman tasked with firing and maintaining manually directed armament aboard a military helicopter. The actual role will vary depending on the task given on a particular mission. For certain aircraft a door gunner would use a fully automatic Gatling gun placement. On many larger aircraft such as military planes a turret is used along with heavy cannons.

== Origins ==
U.S. Army door gunner training (1966)

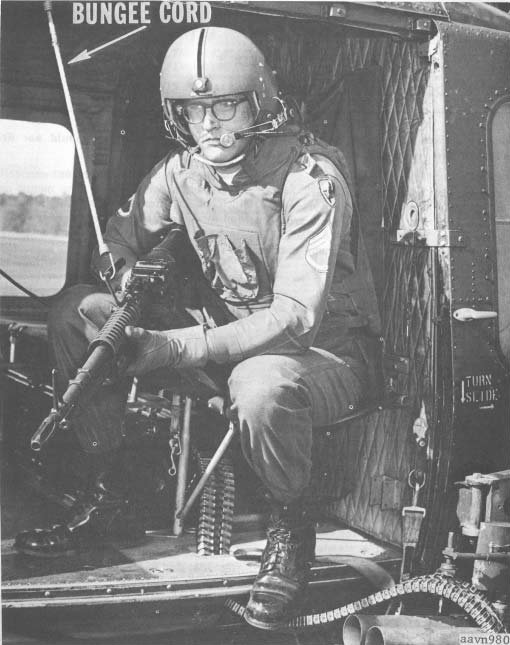
A U.S. Army Vietnam-era "free gunner" (c. 1966) is shown manning his duty position on a UH-1B/C helicopter gunship, with a bungee cord securing his M60 machine gun to the aircraft cabin doorway.

The concept of the door gunner originated during the Vietnam War, when helicopters were first used in combat in large numbers. The original personnel who served as early door gunners aboard CH-21, UH-34, and UH-1 helicopters in Vietnam, were enlisted men, with a designated and specially trained crew chief serving as both the aircraft's maintenance manager and a door gunner. Normally, a second enlisted soldier served as a second door gunner (such as on a UH-1, and UH-34, which both used two gunners – one on each side of the aircraft). Later, as the war progressed, the door gunner position sometimes used a non-aviation rated/trained soldier or marine, that volunteered for door gunner duties.

For the majority of the Vietnam War, the principal weapon of the door gunner was a medium machine gun (MG), initially, a M1919A4 .30 caliber MG, and soon thereafter, the M60 7.62mm MG became the standard helicopter door armament system. Initially however not all helicopters were armed or outfitted with a dedicated MG for door armament. For example, the very first U.S. Army helicopter units, flying CH-21 helicopters, that began flying combat missions in Vietnam in 1962 didn't. Therefore, door gunners on Vietnam photographs are sometimes seen using an M1 Carbine, an M14 rifle, or an M16 rifle, as their only weapon. HH-43 door gunners used the M1918 Browning Automatic Rifle.

Initially, the door gunner's MG weapons were mounted on swiveling mounts (on a pintle mount) in order to retain and steady the door armament weapon. As the war progressed, using bungee cords to suspend/retain the MG became a common practice, as the newfound maneuverability of these "bungeed" weapons allowed for increased firing angles. However, some door gunners simply continued to hand-wield the weapon for maximum level of maneuverability of fire. This practice was commonly termed as using a Free 60.

Door gunners were normally restrained for safety within the aircraft, by either using a standard lap belt, or if the gunner wanted freedom of movement within the aircraft while still being retained, he used a monkey harness, which was a GI safety harness worn on the torso, and anchored to the aircraft floor, or cabin wall. The monkey harness allowed a door gunner great movement, including to lean outward on the helicopter skids, to get a better firing angle.

The door gunner position was not a particularly popular one, due to the exposed position of manning a machine gun in the open door of a helicopter. According to popular legend, the door gunner on a Vietnam era Huey gunship had a life span of 5 minutes. This was obviously exaggerated but displays the hazards of this particular military job at the time. Today, helicopters like the UH-60 have two machine guns firing out of two windows located behind the pilots. The CH-46, CH-47 and CH-53 have an additional gun that is fired from the rear ramp. The UH-1 (still in use by the U.S. Marine Corps, as the UH-1Y) is still manned as it was in the Vietnam War, with the gunner firing from the open cabin door.

== Modern door gunners ==
U.S. Army door gunnery exercise (2019) (3:07)

U.S. Navy door gunners now provide stand off security against attack by small craft. U.S. Army crew chiefs in UH-60 and CH-47 units serve as gunners in addition to their maintenance duties. Today, the term "door gunner" usually applies to those personnel that are not qualified Crew Chiefs and thus don't fly operationally (the exception would be maintenance personnel that are on flight status for test flight purposes in the aviation maintenance company within aviation battalions; in this case, these personnel do not fly often).

The modern door gunners are normally drawn from support soldiers within the aviation battalion, detailed from his company to one of the flight companies within the battalion. Upon notification of an upcoming deployment to a hostile fire zone, an aviation unit is allowed to select and train personnel assigned to the unit for the duration of the deployment (flight status is terminated upon completion of the deployment). They normally undergo a specified training period (normally referred to as a "progression") and then assume part-time or, in some cases dependent on the needs of the companies and the battalion as a whole, full-time flying duties. Duties range from preparation of the machine guns (typically M240 model weapons), performing in-flight observer duties, and assisting the crew chief with maintaining the aircraft.

After completing a certain number of combat missions Army door gunners are eligible for the award of the Army Aviation Badge.

U.S. Air Force door gunners are now called Special Mission Aviators (AFSC 1A9X1). These SMAs fly on HH-60G Pavehawks, CV-22 Ospreys and UH-1N Hueys. SMAs replaced the former position of Aerial Gunner and Helicopter Flight Engineer, combining all duties. Besides manning the machine gun, they are responsible for weight and balance, take-off and landing data, preflight, radios, defensive systems, scanning, hoisting, deploying ropes and must be proficient in NVG operations.

Helicopters from the U.S. Coast Guard Helicopter Interdiction Tactical Squadron (HITRON) use door gunners armed with sniper rifles to disable suspect vessels.

== Equipment ==
Most door gunners use some sort of machine gun such as the M60 or the M60D (a modification of the basic M60 for aircraft), M240, M2HB, or more recently, the General Electric M134 minigun.

== Image gallery ==
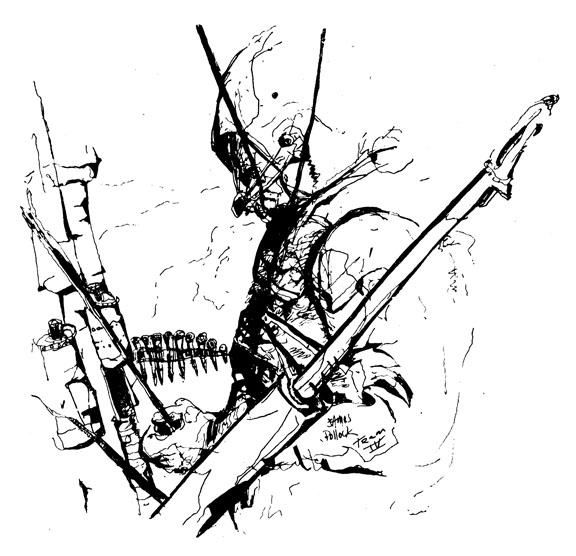
Door Gunner, by James Pollock, U. S. Army Vietnam Combat Artists Team IV (CAT IV 1967). Pen and ink drawing of Vietnam era door gunner. Courtesy National Museum of the U. S. Army.

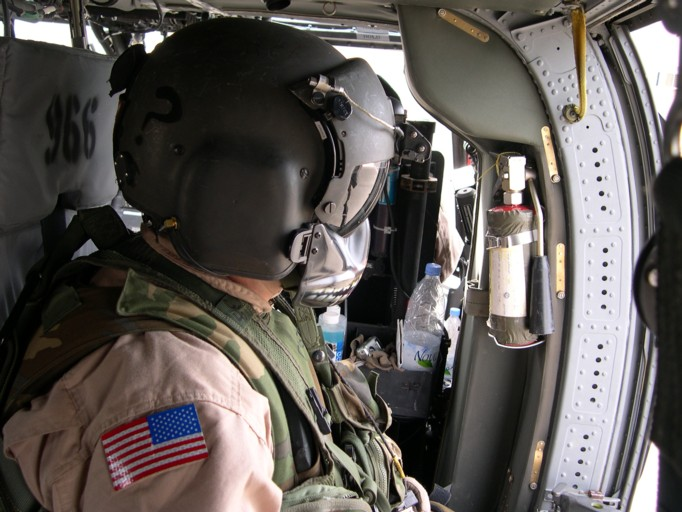
A UH-60 Black Hawk door gunner in Iraq (2005) wearing the HGU-56/P Maxillofacial Shield made by Gentex. The shield improves communication and protects from rotor wash effects.

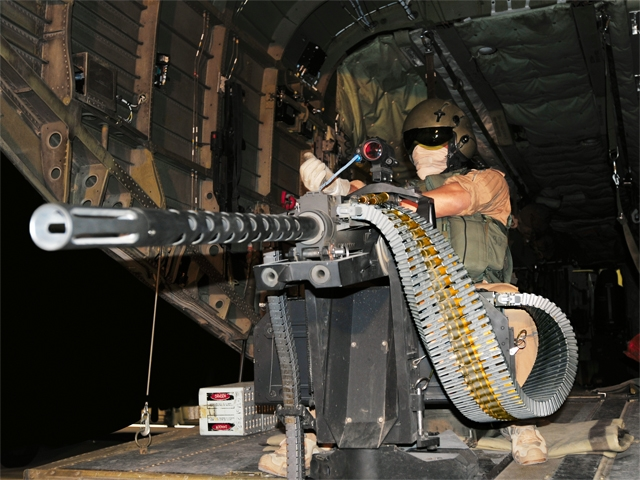
A German Army door gunner mans an M3M on board a CH-53 helicopter.

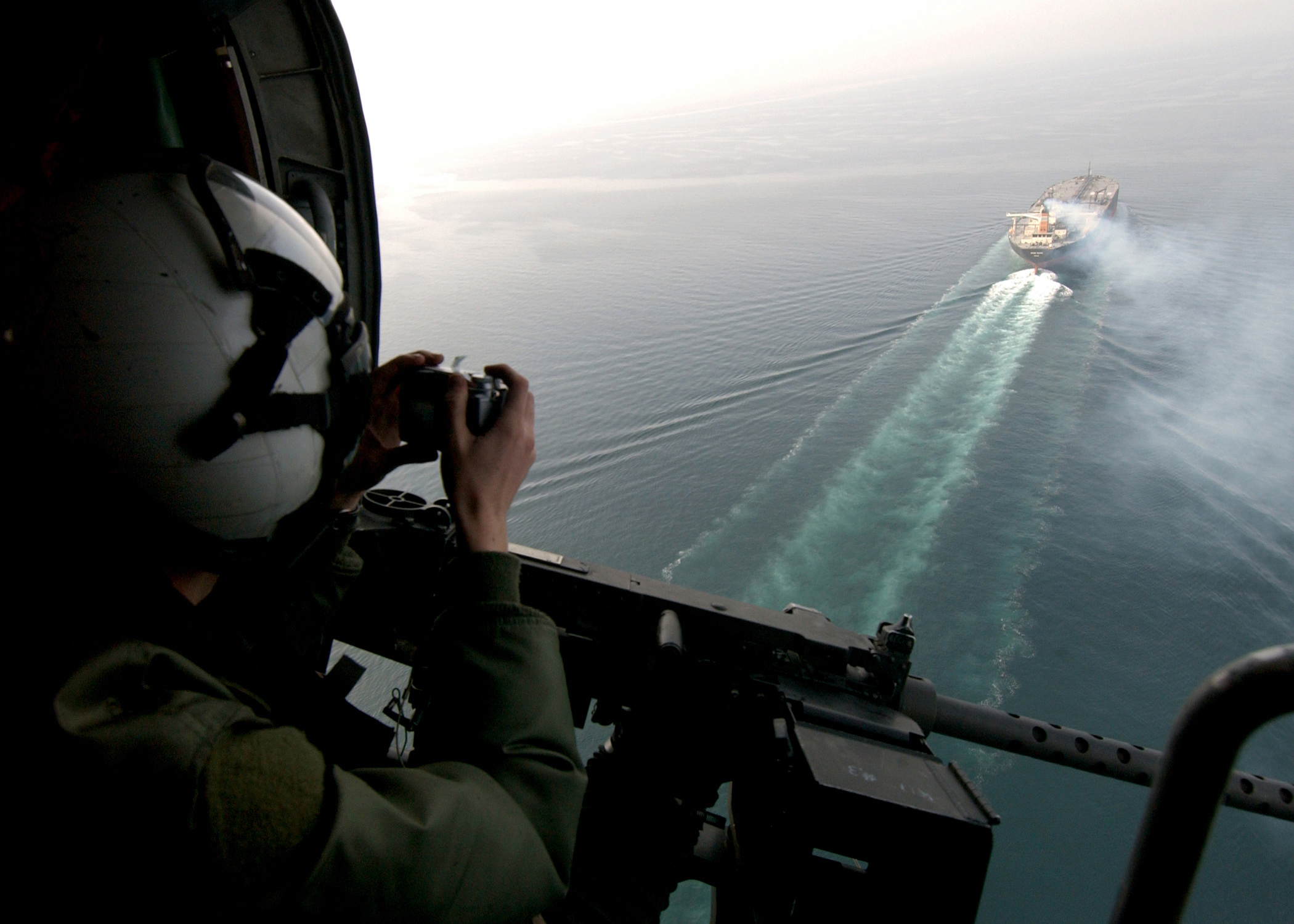
US Navy door gunner in 2000, in response to the attack on the USS Cole Navy door gunners now provide stand off security against attack by small craft.

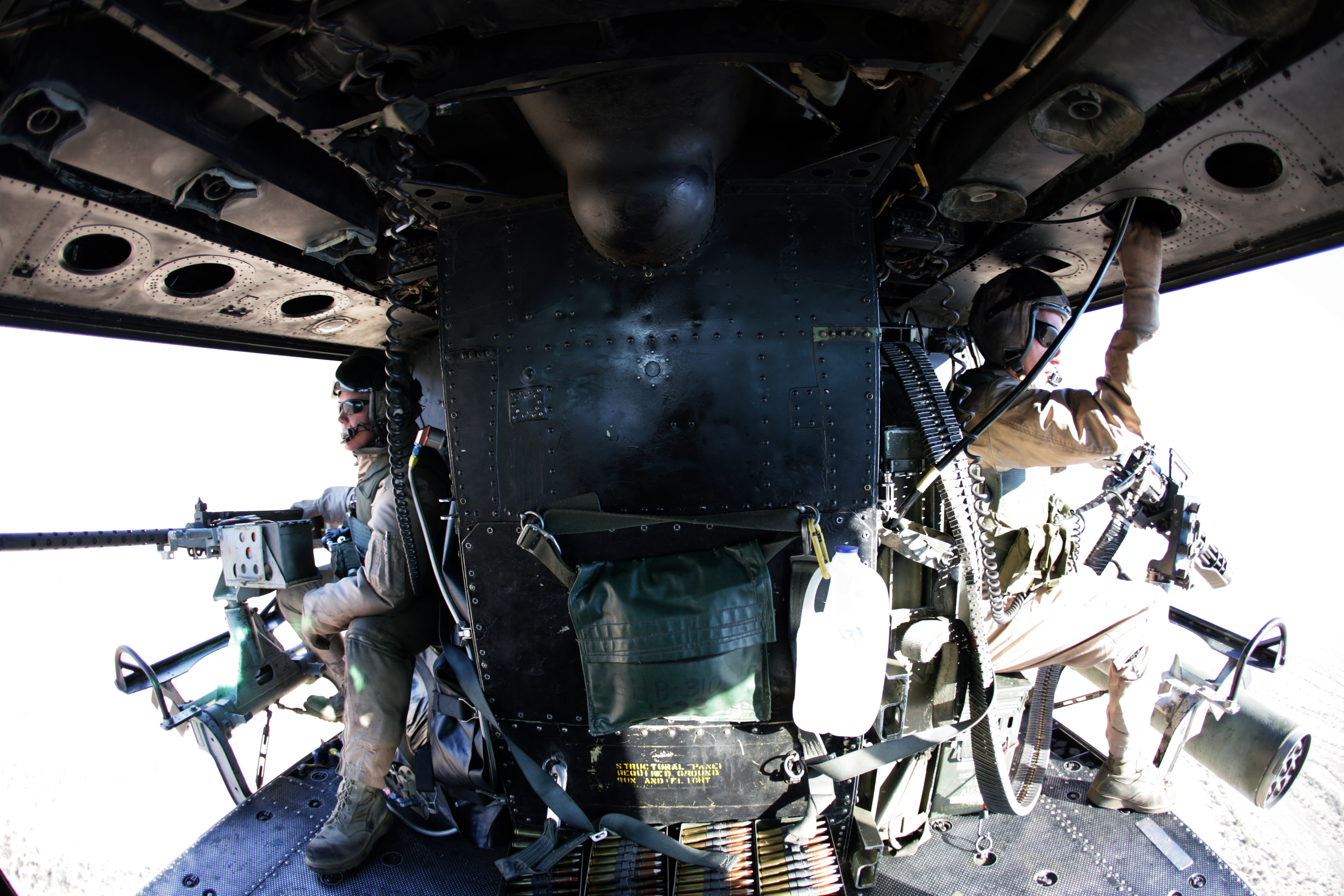
USMC UH-1Y door gunners. GAU-21 .50 cal machine gun (left), GAU-17/A 7.62mm gatling gun (right).

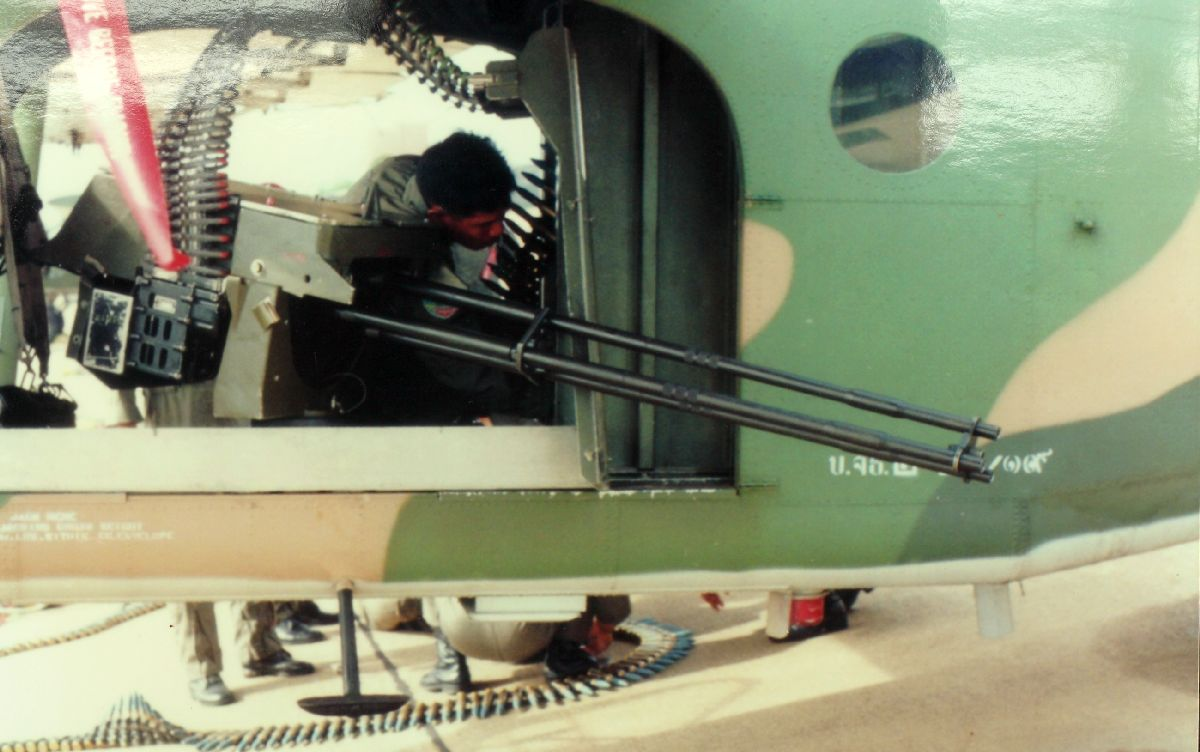
XM197 mounted behind AU-23 Peacemakers side doors.

== See also ==
- Tail gunner
- Nose gunner
- Loadmaster
