= Rose turret =

Gun turret fit to the rear position of some Avro Lancaster heavy bombers

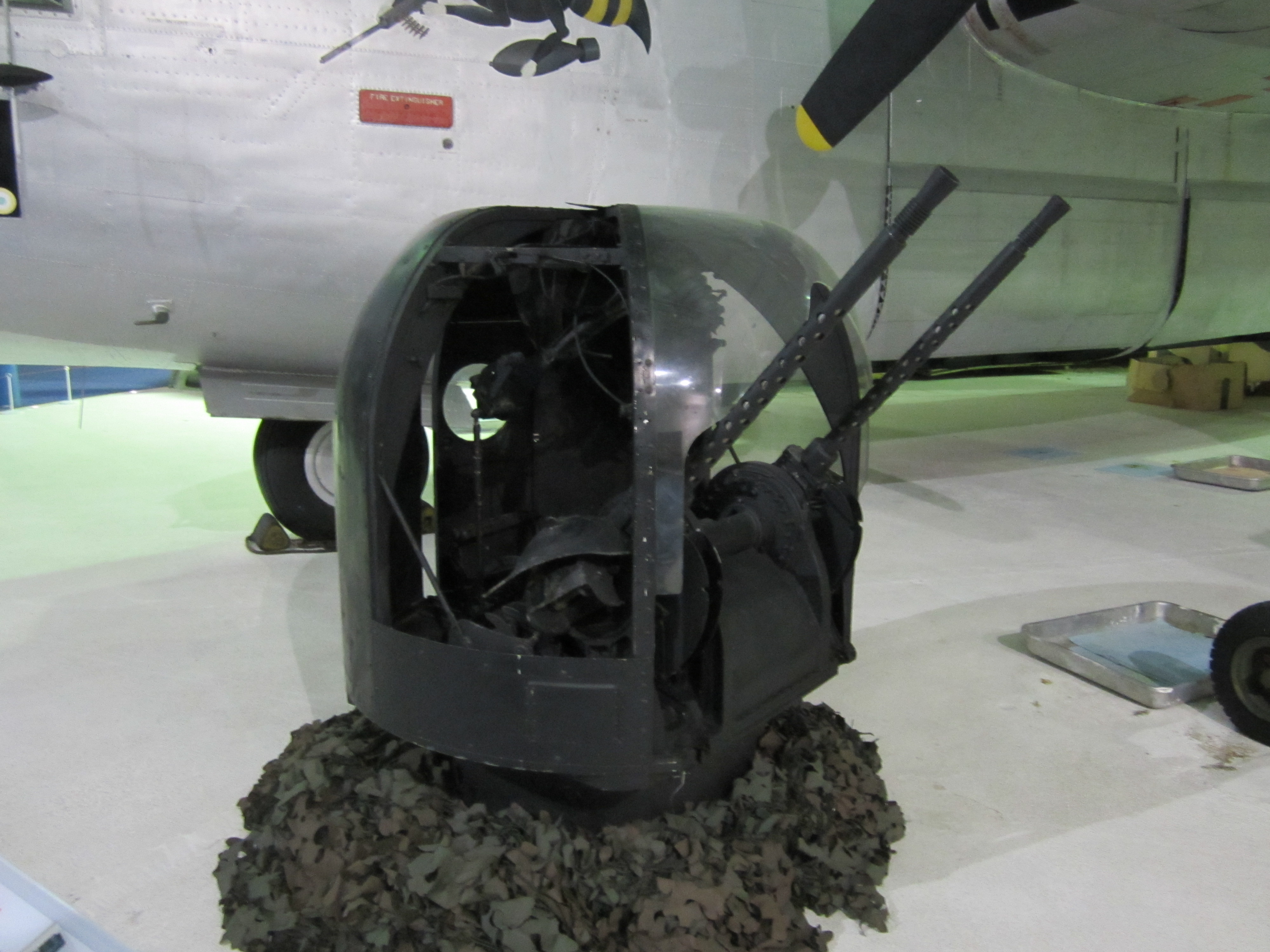
- A Rose turret on display at RAF Museum London (Note: The aircraft in the background is a Consolidated Liberator, not an Avro Lancaster.)

Service history
- Used by: Royal Air Force
- Wars: Second World War

Production history
- Designed: 1943–1944
- Manufacturer: Rose Brothers
- Produced: 1944–1945
- No. built: 400

Specifications
- Crew: One gunner
- Main armament: Two M2 Browning heavy machine guns

The Rose turret (sometimes known as the Rose-Rice turret) was a gun turret fitted to the rear position of some British Avro Lancaster heavy bombers in 1944–45. It was armed with two American 0.5 inch (12.7 mm) light-barrel Browning AN/M2 heavy machine guns — the standard American defensive weapon used in turreted and flexible mounts in the Boeing B-17 Flying Fortress and Consolidated B-24 Liberator and other aircraft.

Development of the turret began in 1943 as part of a program to improve the Lancaster's defensive armament but it did not enter production until late 1944. The Royal Air Force (RAF) ordered 600 Rose turrets in June 1944 and 400 were completed by the end of the Second World War in Europe. The turret was generally regarded as an improvement over previous designs, although its guns had a high rate of stoppage during combat.

== Development ==
When introduced to service, all three of the Avro Lancaster's gun turrets were fitted with Browning medium machine guns firing the .303 British round. The front and mid-upper turret were each fitted with two .303 guns, and the rear turret had four. A small number of early Lancasters were also equipped with a ventral turret on the bottom of the fuselage fitted with two .303s, but this turret was phased out from 1942.

The .303 guns were soon regarded as being inadequate, however, and in 1942 the Air Staff identified a requirement to fit the Lancasters with a turret armed with more powerful 0.50 inch (12.7 mm) heavy machine guns "as soon as possible"; this view was supported by Air Marshal Arthur Harris, the air officer commanding-in-chief of Bomber Command.

A conference was held at the Air Ministry on 11 January 1943 to discuss the optimal armament for the Lancaster. The consensus view of the participants was that the aircraft should be fitted with two 20 mm cannon in its mid-upper turret, two .303 inch guns in the forward turret and two .50 inch guns in the rear turret. At the conclusion of the conference, Air Vice Marshal Ralph Sorley, who was responsible for the RAF's technical requirements, stated that "every effort should be made to introduce the mid-upper and redesigned tail turrets in a year's time" and that the Lancaster's armament would be obsolete if this deadline was not met.

Despite Sorley's views, development of an upgraded rear turret for the Lancaster proceeded slowly. Harris became frustrated with the slow progress of the project and did not believe that the Air Ministry would be able to produce the turret in time. As a result, he decided to go outside the official channels and personally asked the small Gainsborough firm of Rose Brothers to develop a turret for the Lancaster; this company had previously developed an improved gun mounting for the Handley Page Hampden medium bomber in 1940 upon a request from Harris. The Ministry of Aircraft Production subsequently offered to provide draughtsmen to help Rose Brothers develop the turret, but the head of the company turned down this offer and relied upon Air Vice Marshal Edward Rice for technical advice. Rice was one of the senior Bomber Command station commanders, and had travelled with Harris to visit Rose Brothers at the start of the project. He subsequently led No. 1 Group RAF from February.

Harris obtained Sorley's agreement to support the development of what was by then known as the Rose turret in June 1943. However, Nash & Thompson, which produced the Lancaster's .303 turrets, was also commissioned to develop a .50 inch armed turret as the Air Ministry and Ministry of Aircraft production did not want to rely upon Rose Brothers alone. Nash & Thompson's design was known as the FN82.

Development of the two new turret designs continued throughout 1943, but neither was ready by early 1944. The Rose turret shook severely during its early firing trials; this was eventually attributed to poor workmanship of the turret's base ring. In June 1944, the RAF placed an order for 600 Rose turrets after the problems with the design had been resolved.

The turrets were built by hand at Rose Brothers' factory at Gainsborough, and were eventually produced at the rate of one per day; this rate was considered to be slow by the Air Staff. Production of the Rose turret ceased at the end of the war – by this time 400 had been completed. The FN82 took even longer to develop, and the first production model was completed in January 1945. None of Bomber Command's Lancasters had been fitted with an FN82 by the end of the war.

== Characteristics ==
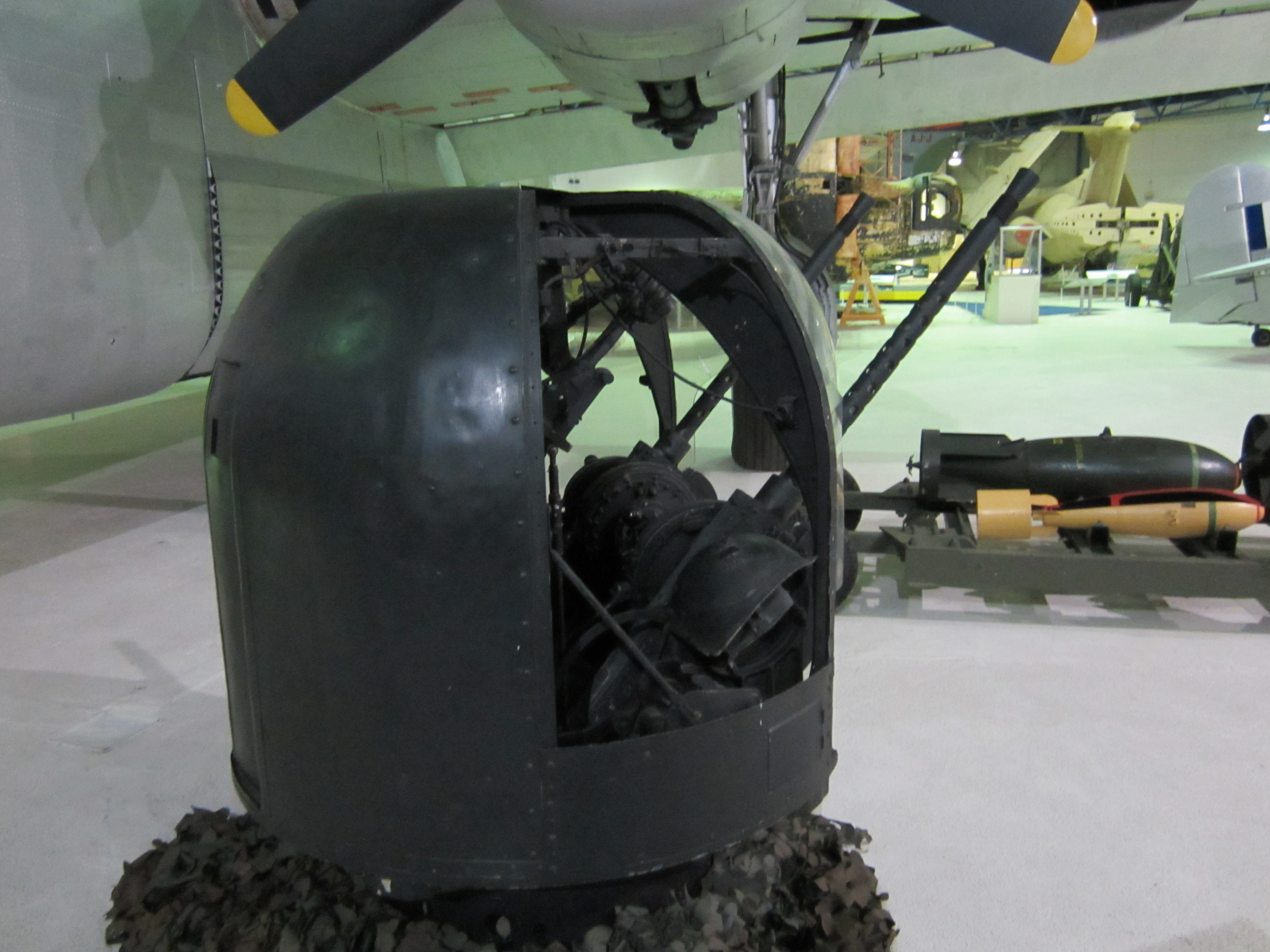
Rear view of the Rose turret at RAF Museum London showing the design's two M2 Browning heavy machine guns

The Rose turret was a roomy design equipped with two .50 in (12.7 mm) Browning AN/M2 heavy machine guns. The turret was driven by hydraulics, and the hydraulic system was easier to use than that in previous designs. The considerable internal space meant that the turret could be fitted with two seats: a layout in which one man operated the guns and the other fed targeting data into the gunsight computer was developed, but not used in practice.

An unusual feature of the Rose design was that the turret was not fully enclosed. Previous designs had perspex around the gun position, but in the Rose turret there was no protective shielding immediately in front of the gunner. This feature reflected operational experience: many Lancaster gunners had cut away parts of their turret perspex in order to obtain a better view, a practice that had originated at RAF Gransden Lodge, and which was subsequently known as the "Gransden Lodge modification". Testing of the Rose turret found that the open design reduced the temperature in the turret – which was typically very low – by only four degrees Celsius compared with a closed design. As well as improving the gunner's view, this feature also made it easier for him to bail out of the aircraft in an emergency.

== Operational service ==
Rose turrets began to be used operationally from late 1944. The turrets were mainly fitted to aircraft in No. 1 Group, though some were allocated to No. 5 Group. Most Lancaster rear gunners regarded the turret as an improvement because of its heavier firepower. However, the turrets proved to be less reliable than the older design, and research conducted by the Ministry of Air found that 60 per cent of Rose turrets experienced gun stoppages during combat compared with 23 per cent of the .303-equipped turrets. On the positive side, aircraft fitted with the Rose turret were found to be half as likely to be attacked by fighters as other Lancasters – the researchers suggested that "this may be accounted by the increased field of view from the turret which would assist evasion from attacks".

By the end of the war, 180 Rose turrets had been fitted to Lancasters. In his Despatch on War Operations, Harris stated that the turret was the only improvement made to the defensive armament of the RAF's heavy bombers after 1942, and argued that "those responsible for turret design and production displayed an extraordinary disregard" for Bomber Command's requirements.
