= Air gunner =

Member of a military aircrew

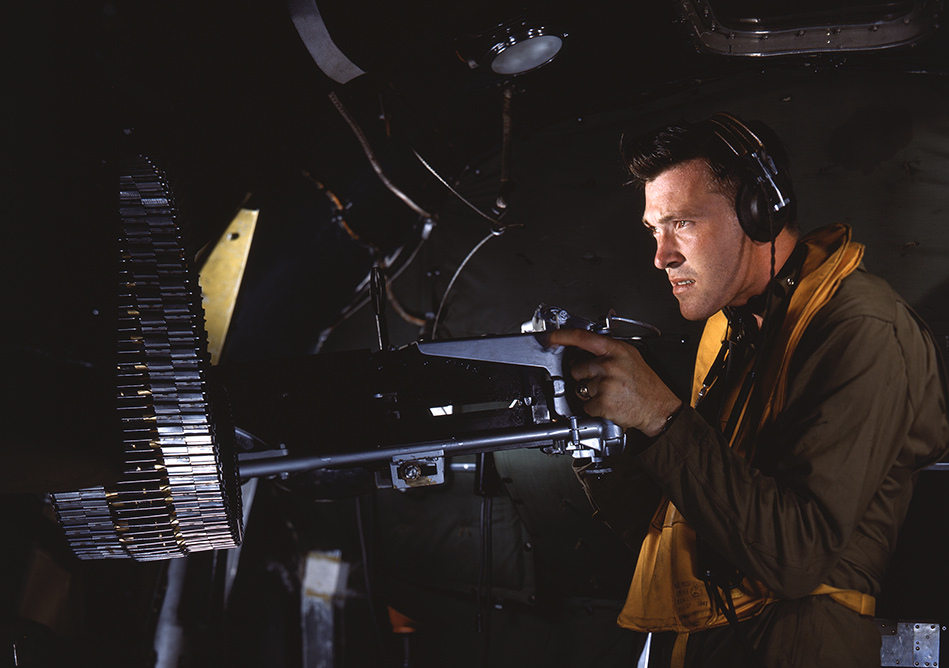
A Waist Gunner in a USAAF B-17 Flying Fortress, 1943

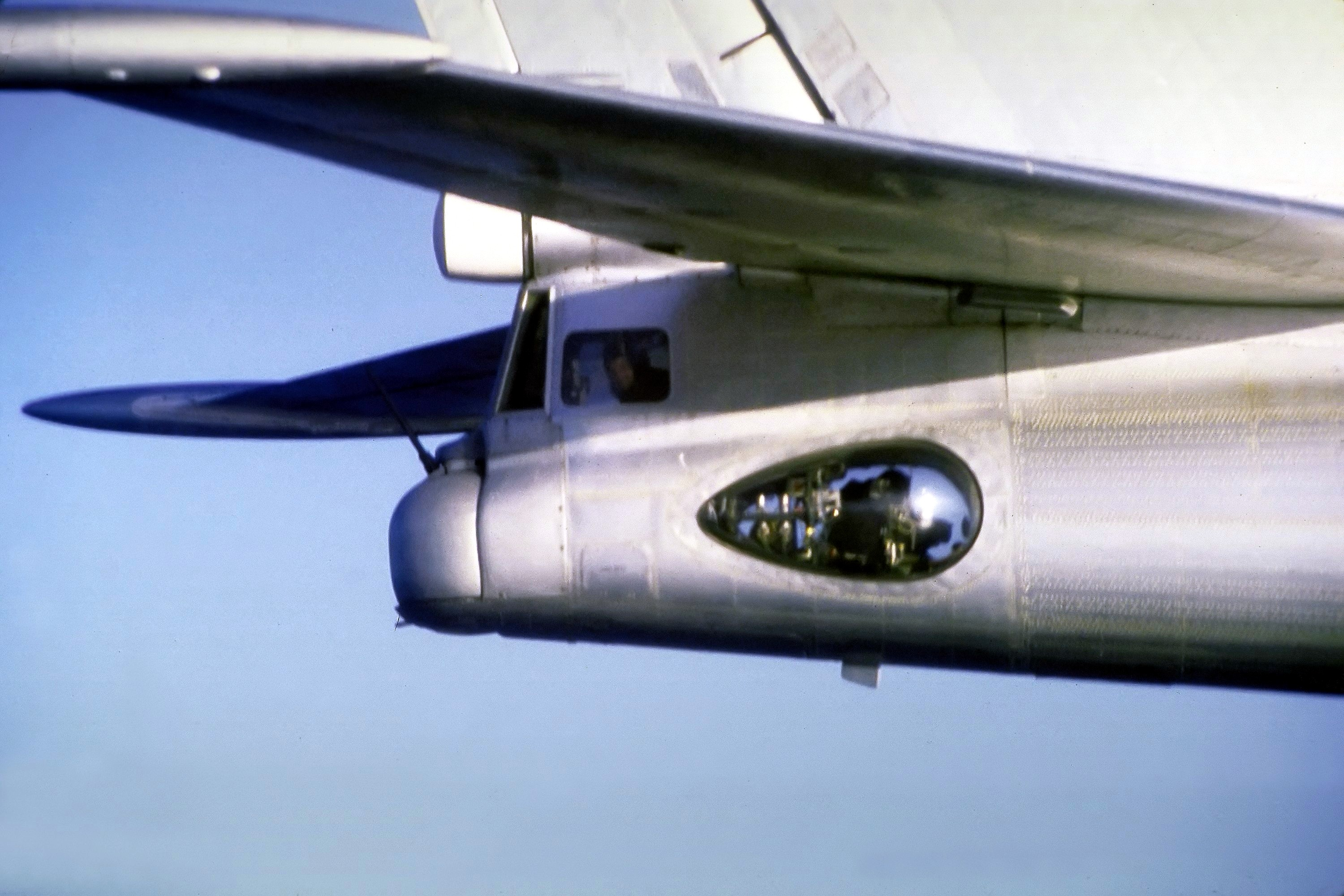
Tupolev Tu-95 tail gun position with 23 mm AM-23 autocannon

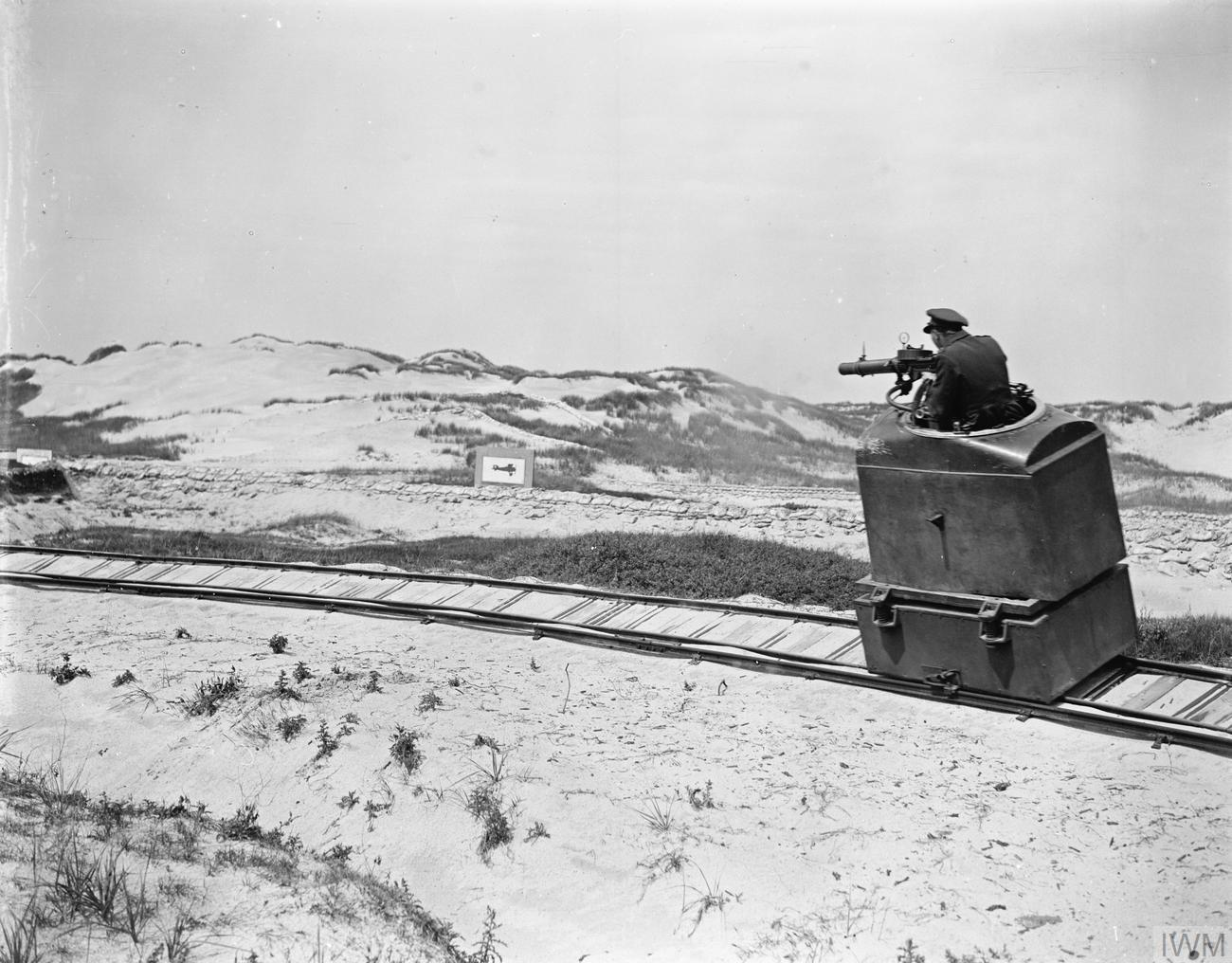
A pilot in training, firing at fixed targets representing German aircraft from a 'cockpit' moving along curving rails, 17 July 1918

An air gunner or aerial gunner is a member of a military aircrew who operates flexible-mount or turret-mounted machine guns or autocannons in an aircraft. Modern aircraft weapons are usually operated automatically without the need for a dedicated air gunner, but older generation (World War II and earlier) bombers used to carry up to eight air gunners.

During World War II, advanced central fire control systems were developed for aircraft such as the B-29 and B-32 that enabled remote control of turrets.

Most modern air gunners are helicopter door gunners, who typically have other primary roles such as crew chief or observer in addition to their air gunner role. Others fly as members of aircrews on gunships, where their duties may include loading guns or manually firing them if computer systems fail. A modern gunner can be someone who operates armament on an aircraft besides the pilot or someone defending the aircraft with a machine gun or auto-cannon (more commonly in World War II).

== See also ==
- Aircrew (Flight crew)
- Door gunner
- Tail gunner
- Nose gunner
- Gunner Badge
