= Nose gunner =

Flight crew member who operates guns on an aircraft

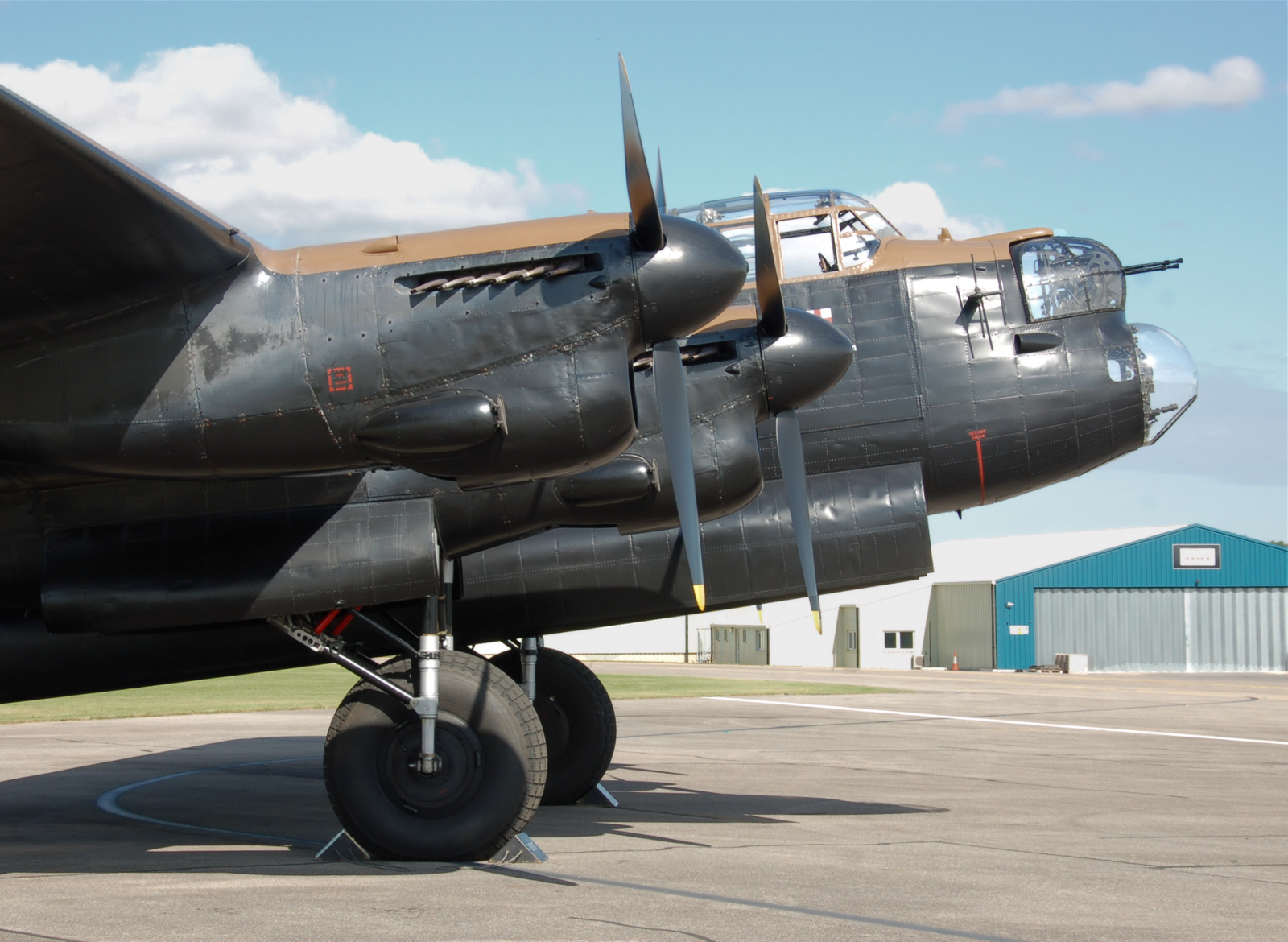
The nose gunner position on the Battle of Britain Memorial Flight Lancaster (PA474)

A nose gunner or front gunner is a crewmember on a military aircraft who operates a machine gun or autocannon turret in the front, or "nose", of the airplane. This position could be operated by someone who was a dedicated gunner, however, it was more common for the operator to have a dual role, the gunnery being a secondary position (with the primary task being navigator or bombardier, most commonly). This is different from fixed guns mounted in the nose and fired by the pilot or co-pilot, since those do not require a nose gunner. Operated nose guns were most common during World War I and World War II, employed by both Allied and Axis forces. Early in WWI, nose-gunners enjoyed a period of popularity on pusher-engined fighters; a gunner would be stationed in the nose, covering the arc ahead of the aircraft. Once the synchronizer was invented, allowing a fixed machine gun to fire through the propeller, the pusher-engined fighter fell into disuse, although nose guns were still commonly seen on multi-engine bomber aircraft.

== Examples ==
=== WWI ===
- Vickers Vimy
- Handley-Page 0/400
- Royal Aircraft Factory F.E.2
- Breguet B.R.2
- Caproni Ca.1 and related aircraft
- Gotha G.IV
- Gotha G.V
- Martin MB-1

=== Interwar ===
- Martin B-10 – 1934 – USAAF's first all-metal monoplane bomber with a manually operated nose turret
- Boulton Paul Overstrand – 1933 – wood and fabric biplane, RAF's first aircraft with powered nose turret

=== WWII examples ===
During World War II, many aircraft were equipped with flexible (aimable, as opposed to fixed) machine guns and cannon for protection against other aircraft. The most common and basic of these was the rear gun or "tail gun", to cover the upper-rear arc of fire. In its basic form, this was a second crew member behind the pilot with a single machine gun, as was seen all through WWI and onward; more complex aircraft might have a gunner located in the actual tail of the aircraft, giving a wider arc of fire and freeing them from the danger of hitting their own tail surfaces. Rear guns could be found in aircraft of many different sizes and types. The nose gun was perhaps the second most common position, although almost exclusively used in multi-engine aircraft, due to the difficulty in firing a flexible gun through the propeller arc or fitting a nose gun position at all with an engine filling the nose area. Twin engine aircraft were ideal for fitting a defensive nose gun, especially since many already had a bombardier (bomb-aimer) located in the nose area. These could range from a simple machine gun on a ball socket in the glazing of the cockpit windscreen (Ju 88), or similar mountings in the nose glazing (early B-17, B-24, G4M, Ki-48, Halifax, etc.), up to power operated turrets (late B-24, Avro Lancaster, Vickers Wellington), or even basic remotely controlled turrets such as seen on late B-17's, and more complex ones such as those used on the He 177 and the B-29 (which had a gun-aiming sight, but no actual guns in the nose).

- The British Armstrong Whitworth Whitley (produced 1936 onwards), a medium bomber-type, which had a crew of five: the pilot, co-pilot, the wireless operator/navigator, the nose-gunner/bomb aimer and the tail gunner. The Whitley employed a single .303 in (7.7 mm) Vickers K machine gun in its nose.
- The Avro Lancaster nose turret was operated by the bomb aimer, whose position was directly below the turret.
- Handley-Page Halifax (most versions fitted with manual nose guns, except Mk.II which sometimes had a powered turret)
- Short Stirling – turret, 2 x.303 Browning
- Short Sunderland – turret, 1 x.303 caliber VGO or Browning
- Vickers Wellington – turret, 2 x.303 Browning
- Mitsubishi Ki-21
- Kawasaki Ki-48
- Nakajima Ki-49
- Mitsubishi G4M
- Yokosuka P1Y
- Kawanishi H6K
- Kawanishi H8K
- The American B-24 Liberator (G-1,H,J,M & PB4Y-1 & variants) (introduced in 1943), which carried a lead crew made up of five officers (pilot, co-pilot, dead reckoning navigator, pilotage navigator/nose gunner and bombardier). It also had five enlisted men (engineer/top turret gunner, radio operator/waist gunner, a second waist gunner, ball turret gunner and tail turret gunner). It had twin .50 in (12.7 mm) M2 Browning machine guns in the nose.
- The American B-17G Flying Fortress (introduced in 1943), which carried a lead crew made up of five officers (pilot, co-pilot, dead reckoning navigator, pilotage navigator/nose gunner and bombardier). It also had five enlisted men (engineer/top turret gunner, radio operator/waist gunner, a second waist gunner, ball turret gunner and tail turret gunner). It had a twin .50 in (12.7 mm) M2 Browning machine gun turret below the nose.
- The German Dornier Do 17 (introduced in 1937), a light bomber with a crew of four (pilot, bombardier/nose gunner, two gunners). It had a single 7.92 mm (0.312 in) MG 15.
- Junkers Ju 88
- Martin Maryland
- Martin Baltimore
- Consolidated PBY Catalina
- Douglas B-18 Bolo
- North American B-25 Mitchell
- Heinkel He 177
- Petlyakov Pe-2
- Tupolev Tu-2
- Blohm & Voss BV 138
- Bristol Blenheim
- Bristol Beaufort
- Heinkel He 111
- Dornier Do 217
- Junkers Ju 188

== See also ==
- Dorsal gunner
- Tail gunner
- Ventral gunner
