= Henri-Louis-Philippe Mougin =

Henri-Louis-Philippe Mougin (16 November 1841 Bourg-en-Bresse – 15 December 1916) was a Batalion Chief of the engineering, aide-de-camp of Raymond Adolphe Séré de Rivières

Mougin was secretary to the Commussion des Cuirassements, established to develop fortifications for the border of France and Germany after the Franco-Prussian War. He developed the Mougin turret of 15-centimetre (5.9 in) thick rolled steel on a concrete base.

He was awarded to the Chevalier of the Legion of Honour in 1871 and Official of the Legion of Honour in 1908.
