= Winkle =

Winkle may refer to:

== Snails ==
- Common periwinkle, an edible marine intertidal species found in Europe and North America
- Any species within the family Littorinidae, the winkles, small intertidal sea snails
- Some edible species of nerites which are also small aquatic snails, some marine, some freshwater
- Sometimes applied to certain land species that have an operculum, such as Pomatias elegans, the land winkle
- Tegula pfeifferi

== Places ==
- Winkle, Illinois, United States, an unincorporated community
- East Danville, Ohio, United States, an unincorporated community also known as Winkle
- Winkle Island (disambiguation), several places with the name

== Fictional characters ==
- Bertram Winkle, a butler in the television series Jessie
- Leslie Winkle, a recurring character in the television series The Big Bang Theory
- Nathaniel Winkle, in the novel The Pickwick Papers by Charles Dickens
- Wilbert G. Winkle, protagonist of Mr. Winkle Goes to War, a 1944 war comedy film, played by Edward G. Robinson
- protagonist of Winnie Winkle, an American comic strip (1920–1996), and ten film shorts; also her adopted brother Perry Winkle
- Witch Winkle, in the British comics magazine Twinkle

== Other uses ==
- nickname of Eric Brown (pilot) (1919–2016), British Royal Navy officer and test pilot
- Gregory Winkle (c. 1955–1971), victim of a serial killer
- Mr. Winkle, a stray dog popularized by his photographer owner
- Winkle squeeze, a play in the card game of contract bridge
- James L. Winkle College of Pharmacy, part of the University of Cincinnati Academic Health Center, Cincinnati, Ohio, United States
- Development codename of the RAF's RX12874 radar detector
- Winkle Brig, a type of sailing boat built between 1985 and 2002

== See also ==
- Van Winkle, a surname and a list of people with the surname
- William Te Winkle (born 1954), American politician
- Bobby Winkles (born 1930), American former Major League Baseball coach and manager and college head coach
- Winkel (disambiguation)
