= AMES Type 85 =

Cold War-era British early warning radar

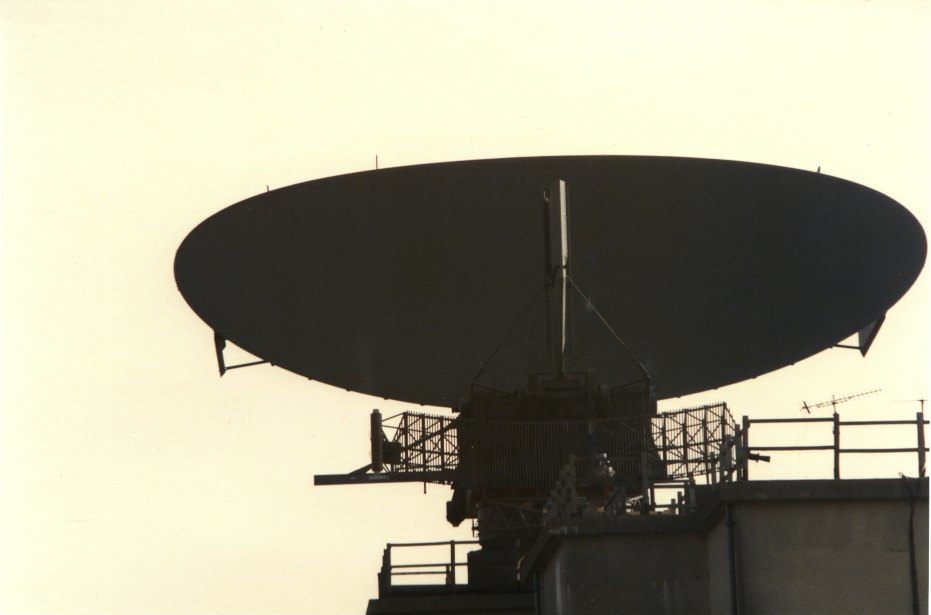
- AMES Type 85 at RAF Staxton Wold
- Country of origin: UK
- Manufacturer: Metropolitan-Vickers (AEI)
- Introduced: 1968
- No. built: 3
- Type: early warning, GCI
- Frequency: S band, 3 GHz ±500 MHz
- PRF: 250 pps
- Beamwidth: 0.5°
- Pulsewidth: 10 µs
- RPM: 4 rpm, optional sector scanning
- Range: 280 mi (450 km)
- Altitude: 63,000 ft (19,000 m)
- Diameter: 60 ft (18 m)
- Azimuth: 360°
- Elevation: 1–12°
- Precision: 1,500 ft (460 m) or better
- Power: 12 × 4.5 MW
- Other names: Blue Yeoman, Blue Riband, Type 40T2

The AMES Type 85, also known by its rainbow code Blue Yeoman, was an extremely powerful early warning (EW) and fighter direction (GCI) radar used by the Royal Air Force (RAF) as part of the Linesman/Mediator radar network. First proposed in early 1958, it was eleven years before they became operational in late 1968, by which time they were already considered obsolete. The Type 85 remained the RAF's primary air defense radar until it was replaced by Marconi Martello sets in the late-1980s as part of the new IUKADGE network.

In the 1950s the RAF deployed the ROTOR reporting network, and later improved this system with the AMES Type 80 radar. While these were being built, the carcinotron radar jammer was tested against it and found to completely blank out its display. At first, it was feared the carcinotron would render all long-range radars useless, but over time a number of new concepts emerged to deal with this threat. Among them was the Blue Riband radar, which used a dozen 8 MW klystrons that randomly changed frequencies in order to overwhelm the jammer signal, and broadcast through an enormous array of four 75 feet (23 m) wide antennas running on railway tracks.

The introduction of the ballistic missile implied future attacks would likely be by medium range ballistic missiles, not strategic bombers. The need for a comprehensive anti-bomber system was questioned, and the high price of the Blue Riband made it a target for outright cancellation. In response, in 1958 a new design was built by combining the electronics from the Blue Riband with a smaller antenna originally developed as an upgrade for the Orange Yeoman radar. The result was the still-prodigious Blue Yeoman design, which proved so promising that it was further upgraded using the larger 60 feet (18 m) antenna from the AMES Type 84. The resulting Type 85 was declared operational at three sites in 1968.

By this time the entire Linesman concept had been called into question, as the radar sites and unhardened centralized command centre would be trivial to destroy even with conventional weapons. Funding for future upgrades to the system was instead directed to replacing it as soon as possible. Type 85 remained in service through the 1970s and into the early 1980s, when it formed part of the new UKADGE system. The Improved UKADGE replaced the Type 85 with a number of smaller and more mobile radars so that backup systems could be placed off-site and then rapidly brought into service if the main radars were attacked. The Type 85s went offline some time in the 1990s.

== History ==
=== ROTOR ===
In the early 1950s the threat of nuclear attack by the Soviet Union led the UK to build an extensive radar network known as ROTOR. ROTOR initially envisioned two phases, the first using upgraded World War II radars like Chain Home, and then from 1957, these would be replaced by a dramatically more powerful radar known as the Microwave Early Warning, or MEW. A key part of the concept was a set of six Sector Control Centers where data from all of the radars would be sent to produce the Recognized Air Picture of the surrounding area.

As ROTOR was just getting started, in 1951 the Telecommunications Research Establishment (TRE) began experimenting with new low-noise crystal detectors that improved reception by 10 dB, and new cavity magnetrons of roughly 1 MW power. Combining these together on a lashed-up antenna, they were able to detect bomber aircraft at hundreds of miles range. A production version of this "Green Garlic" prototype would be available years before the MEW. MEW was turned into a long-term development project and spun off to Marconi Wireless. Green Garlic was rapidly developed as the AMES Type 80 and deployed beginning in 1954, with the initial network operational the next year.

It was soon realized that the system, with minor upgrades, had the optical resolution needed to guide interceptor aircraft to targets even at very long range. This task formerly required dedicated ground controlled interception (GCI) radars with special antennas that provided the required resolution. Upgrades to the Type 80 would allow this task to be combined with the EW role, eliminating the need for separate radars. At the same time, a new 2.5 MW magnetron became available, increasing range beyond the original versions. These Type 80 Mark III's led to many changes in the ROTOR layout as the centralized control rooms were removed and the entire battle from detection to interception was instead handled directly from the radar stations themselves. Ultimately, after several changes in plans, the system emerged with nine Master Radar Stations and about another twenty radars feeding data to them by telephone.

=== Carcinotron ===
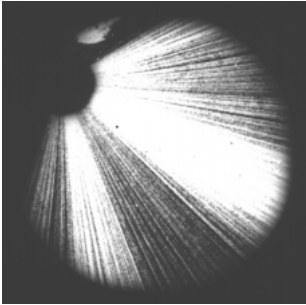
This image shows the effect of four carcinotron-carrying aircraft on a Type 80-type radar. The aircraft are located at roughly the 4 and 5:30 locations. The display is filled with noise any time the antenna's main lobe or sidelobes pass the jammer, rendering the aircraft invisible.

In 1950, engineers at the French company CSF (now part of Thales Group) introduced the carcinotron, a microwave-producing vacuum tube that could be rapidly tuned across a wide range of frequencies by changing a single input voltage. By continually sweeping through the frequencies of known radars, it would overpower the radar's own reflections, and blind them. Its extremely wide bandwidth meant that a single carcinotron could be used to send jamming signals against any radar it was likely to meet, and the rapid tuning meant it could do so against multiple radars at the same time, or rapidly sweep through all potential frequencies to produce barrage jamming.

The carcinotron was revealed publicly in November 1953. The Admiralty Signals and Radar Establishment purchased one and fit it to a Handley Page Hastings named Catherine, testing it against the latest Type 80 late that year. As they feared, it rendered the radar display completely unreadable, filled with noise that hid any real targets. Useful jamming was accomplished even when the aircraft was under the radar horizon, in which case other aircraft had to be 20 miles (32 km) to the sides before they were visible outside the jamming signal. The system was so effective that it appeared to render long-range radar useless.

=== MEW ===
While ROTOR was being installed, the original MEW design at Marconi was still being worked on. With the RAF's immediate needs filled by the Type 80, the requirements for the MEW had been modified to produce a much more capable design. The resulting specification called for a 10 MW L-band klystron and an advanced moving target indication (MTI) system.

Calculations suggested that a carcinotron could produce about 10 W of signal on any given frequency. The 10 MW klystron transmitter would produce 11 W of return signal at 200 nmi, thereby overpowering, or "burning through", the jamming. Unfortunately, the klystron proved to be a problem and was only able to reach 7 MW on occasion. In 1958, the decision was made to abandon it and replace it with an experimental 2 MW L-band magnetron that had been fit to a radar at Bushy Hill in 1956. It was ultimately improved to 2.5 MW.

The MEW worked in the L-band at a 23 cm wavelength. This makes it much less sensitive the effects of Mie scattering off rain and ice crystals, meaning L-band radars are much more effective in rain or heavy cloud. The downside to the longer wavelength is that optical resolution is an inverse function of wavelength, so by operating at about three times the wavelength of the Type 80's 9 cm meant it also had three times less resolution. Some other radar would still be required to accurately guide the fighters.

=== Blue Riband ===
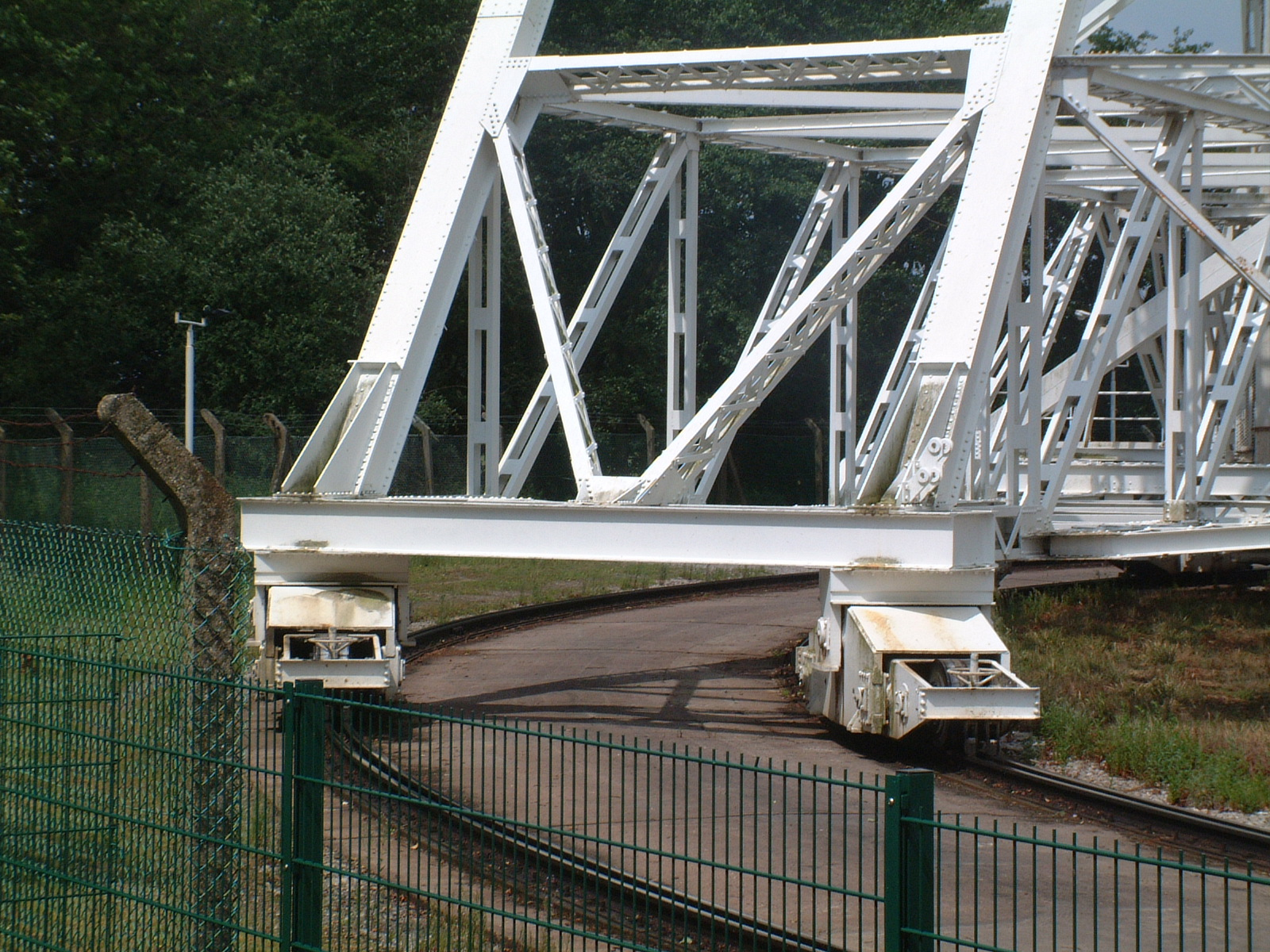
The 250 ft telescope at Jodrell Bank ran on a modified railway, visible here. A similar solution was adopted for Blue Riband.

With the failure of the MEW's original klystron, in 1956 the RRE began development of a new radar in partnership with Metropolitan-Vickers. (Note: Metropolitan-Vickers, also known as Metrovick, was a division of Associated Electrical Industries or AEI. The Metrovick brand was dropped in 1959, and the Type 85 is often associated with AEI instead of Metrovick.) Given the rainbow code "Blue Riband", (Note: "Riband" is not found in any other rainbow codes, and it is not clear in existing sources if this is an official rainbow code or simply selected to sound like one while referring to the famous prize.) the design goal was simply to "produce the largest, most powerful radar that could be deployed in the ADUK." (Note: ADUK is short for Air Defense UK.) Blue Riband would overwhelm any possible carcinotron design, while also providing enough accuracy to directly guide interceptors. Further, they highly desired the system be a 3D radar so the separate height finders could be eliminated; height finders were often as expensive as the primary radars and time-consuming to operate.

Magnetrons are somewhat odd devices in that they produce a powerful microwave signal in one step, and the frequency of the microwaves they produce is a function of the physical dimensions of the device and cannot be changed after manufacture. In contrast, the klystron acts purely as an amplifier. Given multiple reference signals, say from crystal oscillators, the klystron can amplify any source within a bandwidth of about 100 MHz, beyond which its efficiency falls off. Thus, by moving to a klystron it was possible to change the frequency of the signal with every pulse by connecting it to a series of different source signals.

To jam such a signal, the carcinotron would have to broadcast across the entire 100 MHz band, thereby diluting the signal to the point where it could no longer overpower the radar's pulses. Due to the radar equation, the energy of the radar's pulses falls off with the fourth power of range, so having enough power to ensure the carcinotron could not keep up at long range meant the output had to be huge. Blue Riband solved this problem by mixing the signal from multiple klystrons together, two or four depending on the model, and then broadcasting the resulting 8 MW signal.

Blue Riband planned to use the output of a dozen transmitters, each with two or four klystrons feeding a single feed horn with a 1/2 degree vertical angle. The twelve horns produced a beam that was 6 degrees high in total, and the vertical angle of the target could be estimated by comparing the strength of its signal in adjacent horns.

To match the resolution of the Type 80, the antenna had to be wide enough to focus the signals into a similar 1/3 degree wide beam. The downside to such a tightly focused pencil beam is that the beam sweeps past targets very rapidly as the antenna rotates to scan the sky. In the case of the Type 80's pulse repetition frequency of 250 pulses-per-second and its rotation speed of 4 rpm, this meant only 3 to 5 pulses would hit any given target as the beam swung past it. This leads to a relatively low blip-to-scan ratio, and if even a few of these pulses are jammed, the target might disappear. To solve this problem, Blue Riband proposed mounting four antennas in a square, meaning the entire sky would be scanned after it rotated 90 degrees. This allowed the rotation to be slowed to 1/2 rpm, thereby greatly increasing the number of "paints".

Meeting the resolution goals required a parabolic reflector that was 75 by 50 feet (23 by 15 m). Four of these together produced an enormous system, so large that there was no way it could be mounted on existing bearing systems. They ultimately settled on the solution used by the 250 foot (76 m) diameter Lovell Telescope (Note: At that time known simply as the "250 ft telescope".) at the Jodrell Bank Observatory. This runs on a modified railway roadbed with multiple sets of bogies carrying a huge triangular framework. For the Blue Riband, they adopted a somewhat smaller version with a 100 foot (30 m) diameter with six bogies carrying a framework on top that acted like a flat turntable.

The twelve transmitters would be buried in the centre of the assembly. Their power was fed to the antennas through a series of twelve rotating wave-guides, something that didn't exist at the time. Two possible waveguide designs were trialled, one at the RRE and another at Metrovick.

During development, a possible way to build the system with a single rotating wave-guide was presented. This fed the antennas a single signal through a vertically oriented slot antenna, and used an effect known as "squint" to move the beam up and down. Squint causes the signal to change angle when its frequency changes. By setting the dozen klystrons to different frequencies, squint would cause each one to exit at a different angle. This concept was abandoned when it was pointed out that steering the beam using the frequency meant any one aircraft would always be hit by the same frequency, which made the jammer's job much easier.

Another concept that was raised was to use only two antennas mounted back-to-back and use separate sets of a dozen feedhorns on both. One would be set to a beamwidth of 0.4 degrees covering the horizon, and the other 0.6 covering higher angles. This provided higher accuracy on the horizon while also increasing the total vertical coverage from 6 degrees to 12. In total there would be twenty-four transmitters. It does not appear this design was pursued.

A contract for the new klystrons was sent to EMI near the end of 1957. By this time the concept was to have each of the transmitters tuned to a different 100 MHz bandwidth, with the set of all twelve covering a band of 500 MHz, beyond which the receivers also began to fall off in sensitivity. By connecting the transmitters at random to the feedhorns, the frequency hitting any given target changed with every pulse, forcing them to jam the entire 500 MHz band in a form of barrage jamming.

=== Changing concepts ===
By 1956, the installation of the Type 80s to the existing ROTOR network was going well. Attention was turning to replace these sites with anti-jamming radars like Blue Riband and MEW. However, this was also a time of intense debate within the Air Ministry about the entire nature of air defence.

ROTOR was based on the concept of damage limitation. No defensive system is perfect, and some enemy aircraft would get through. If they were carrying conventional weapons, or even early atomic bombs, the damage being caused would be survivable. The goal of ROTOR was to limit damage to the UK while RAF Bomber Command was destroying the USSR's ability to launch additional attacks.

The introduction of the hydrogen bomb seriously upset this concept. Now even a small number of aircraft making it past the defence would wreak catastrophic damage on the country. Damage limitation was no longer a useful concept; if nuclear war came it was likely the UK would be destroyed. In this new environment, deterrence became the only possible form of defence.

Thus, from as early as 1954 the strategic thinking came to look at air defences primarily as a way to protect the V bomber force, ensuring it would have enough time to get airborne. For this role, there was no need for the whole-country coverage of ROTOR. Instead, only the Midlands area where the V bombers were based needed protection. As a result of this change in emphasis, several ROTOR sites were removed and the number of interceptor aircraft was repeatedly cut back.

By 1956 even this "defence of the deterrent" concept was being debated. As one could not expect to stop every attacker, and any one of those would destroy some portion of the V-force, the only way to ensure the V-force survived in sufficient numbers to present a credible deterrent was to launch every available bomber whenever a serious threat appeared. If this was the case, any defensive systems would be protecting empty airfields and unflyable aircraft. While the need for early warning of the attack still required a powerful radar, requirements for anything beyond that, the interceptors and missiles, was questionable. Debate on the topic raged from 1956.

=== 1957 White Paper ===
Into this debate came the 1957 Defence White Paper, which had an enormous effect on the British military. A key issue in the Paper was the conclusion that the strategic threat was moving from bombers to ballistic missiles. The UK was within the range of medium range ballistic missiles (MRBMs) fired from Eastern Europe, and as these were simpler and cheaper than bombers, it was believed these would be the primary force aimed at the UK by the mid-1960s. Studying the issue, there seemed to be no scenario under which the first attack would be by bombers alone, although mixed bomber/missile attacks were envisioned.

In response, the UK would also move from bombers to intermediate range ballistic missiles (IRBMs) as the basis for their own nuclear force. Defensive systems against aircraft would only be needed for a short period while the USSR built up its missile fleet, and beyond the mid-1960s the only purpose of radar would be early warning, accurate guidance was no longer a concern. A powerful radar like the Blue Riband simply couldn't justify its cost, given that it would only be needed for a few years after it might be ready. As part of this same general reasoning, other air defence systems were cancelled, among them the Operational Requirement F.155 interceptor and the Blue Envoy missile. This left even less need for a long-range radar like Blue Riband.

A much more important issue, moving forward, would be a system to provide early warning of a missile attack. Some consideration had been given to using Blue Riband in this role, as part of the Violet Friend anti-ballistic missile research. But by this time it was known that the US was looking for a northern European site to host their new BMEWS radar-warning system. The UK approached the US in October 1957, initially offering a site in northern Scotland, but in February 1960 it was moved south to its eventual location at RAF Fylingdales in order to allow it to fall under the protective cover of the shrinking air-defence area.

=== Blue Yeoman ===
While all of this was taking place, the RRE North Site, the Army-oriented centre, had invested some effort into a new radar antenna to replace the rather complex lens system used on the AMES Type 82 "Orange Yeoman". This emerged as a conventional 45 by 21.5 foot (13.7 by 6.6 m) parabolic reflector. A prototype was developed for installation at the North Site, along with a new klystron that would replace the Type 82's magnetron. Further development was cancelled when it was found the Type 80 could guide missiles without the Type 82's assistance, the role that the Type 82 had originally been developed for.

Like the Blue Riband, the Type 82 had a stack of twelve vertical feedhorns in order to provide height measurements. This led to an early-1958 effort to adapt the Blue Riband's powerful transmitters to this new antenna. This resulted in the obvious code name "Blue Yeoman". (Note: It is unclear if this was an official rainbow code or simply a nickname.) The prototype antenna was moved to the RRE's South Site, the RAF-related area, and mounted on a version of the Type 80's turntable. By mid-1959 the antenna was installed, and by the end of that year, it was operational with a single transmitter feeding two waveguides. This allowed them to experiment with the frequency-hopping systems and other features. Ultimately, only four klystrons were fit instead of twelve. Over the next two years, the system was used to develop the system's constant false alarm rate, a complex dual-horn feed that reduced sidelobes, and new two-pulse moving target indication systems.

Based on this ongoing work, in November 1958 the Air Ministry set the specifications for a production model and gave it the name AMES Type 85. This was similar to the prototype but had a larger antenna of 60 by 21.75 feet (18.29 by 6.63 m) that had originally been developed for the MEW. The MEW had, by this time, become the AMES Type 84. Sharing the same antenna system had significant benefits. The feedhorns were modified from the original concept to produce a beam 3/8 degrees horizontal and 1 degree vertical, and placed in a staggered configuration side-by-side. The antenna was designed to be fit at either of two angles, covering 1 to 12 degrees vertically, or 3 to 15 degrees. While Metrovick began production of the Type 85, EMI was given a production contract for its klystrons.

=== Anti-jamming mission ===
As the effects of the 1957 White Paper were examined, one interesting possibility came to dominate radar planning. This was the idea that the Soviets could fly an aircraft far offshore, as far as 300 miles (480 km), and use a carcinotron to jam the BMEWS. If it were jammed there would be no way to detect a missile launch, and the V-force would have to launch on warning as a safety measure. If the Soviets repeated this trick, it could quickly wear out the bombers and their crews. Such aircraft would have to be attacked or driven off, which meant that some form of anti-jamming radar would be needed to get the interceptors into range of the jammer.

Throughout the 1950s a second concept for dealing with the carcinotron had been developed. This used the carcinotron itself as the signal source, and used a modified version of triangulation to pinpoint its location. The idea had been considered throughout the 1950s, but it was only now that there was a clear reason to build it; this system could detect the location of the aircraft at ranges far beyond even the Blue Yeoman, even when the aircraft was still below the radar horizon. This system required at least two antennas per detector, and it was suggested that a Blue Yeoman could provide double duty by acting as one of the two. Thus by the end of 1958, it had been decided that Blue Yeoman would be part of this new RX12874 system as well.

When the prototype system at the RRE South Site became operational, it began to be used to test a new type of anti-jamming system known as the "Dicke-Fix", (Note: Or, in American sources, "Dicke Receiver" or "Dicke Filter".) after its inventor, Robert Henry Dicke. (Note: Best known for his contributions to the Brans–Dicke theory of gravitation.) Dicke was an American radio astronomer who had grown frustrated by the interference caused by automobile ignition systems, which in the 1930s were very noisy in the radio frequency spectrum. He noticed that the noise was in the form of short pulses, and designed a filter that removed such signals. In 1960, the Canadian National Research Council published a report on using this design to filter out carcinotron signals, which, like the ignition noise, looked like very short pulses in any single frequency as it swept through the band. This offered an improvement in performance up to 40%.

At the same time, the teams at Bristol and Ferranti that had been working on the Blue Envoy missile had struck upon a clever idea. Using those portions of the Blue Envoy that had been completed, the new radars and ramjet engines, they adapted the Bristol Bloodhound to produce the Bloodhound Mark II that was effective at about 75 miles (121 km) range. The cost of this adaptation was very low, and it was accepted for development despite the doubts about the need for anti-aircraft weapons. This gave added reason to have a radar that could provide early warning with enough range even in strong jamming to give the missiles ample time to aim and fire.

=== Plan Ahead ===
Considering all of these changes, and especially new tests with the carcinotron that were revealed to the Air Staff in July 1957, plans for a new network began to emerge in late 1958. This would be based on a set of three main tracking stations arranged roughly in a triangle, RAF Staxton Wold, RAF Neatishead and RAF Bramcote, and three passive tracking stations for the anti-jamming receivers at RAF Hopton, RAF Fairlight and RAF Oxenhope Moor. Each would be equipped with a Type 85 and a Type 84. Two of the northern ROTOR stations, RAF Buchan and RAF Saxa Vord, would retain their Type 80s purely for early warning - although these radars could be jammed, any attempt to do so would indicate a raid was coming from the north and thereby put the main stations to the south on alert. Two additional Type 84's would be placed at these stations.

Information from the three main stations would be sent over the data network originally intended to be part of ROTOR Phase 3, which envisioned digital computers being fed information from the radar sites, automatically generating tracks, and sending guidance to the interceptors in digital form. Another change from ROTOR was centralized command and control at two Master Control Centers (MCCs). One reason for this was that the new radars scanned the horizon and did not cover the area above the stations, so an adjacent radar would have to provide tracking when aircraft entered these areas. Additionally, the passive tracking system had to combine information from multiple sites. As more than one radar would always be involved in the tracking exercise, the system was naturally centralized. Two MCCs were planned, at RAF Bawburgh and RAF Shipton were selected as these sites.

In non-jamming conditions, the resulting network would cover the entire British Isles, and a significant portion of north-western Europe as far as Denmark. The remaining Type 80s would extend this far into the Norwegian Sea. In the worst-case jamming scenarios, the coverage would shrink to the area south of about Dundee in Scotland, covering most of England except Cornwall. The passive tracking system would extend this out, at least against the jammer-carrying aircraft, to cover all of England north to the Scottish highlands as well as the eastern half of Ireland.

The costs of the system were estimated to be £30 million (£628 million). A skeleton system of three radars and one MCC could be available by 1962, which was when the new version of the Bloodhound missile would be available. The Air Ministry approved the concept on 8 January 1959, and it was given the name Plan Ahead in August.

=== New delays ===
Within months the price started climbing as the true requirements of the computer systems became fully realized. The system was now estimated to cost between £76 and £96 million, and as much as £100 million (equivalent to $2.094486554×10^{9} in 2025), once all the phone lines were included. In response, in May 1960 it was decided to cut the system to only the initial three radars and single MCC at Bawburgh, bringing the cost to around £60 million.

By the end of 1960, parts of the equipment were beginning to pile up at the manufacturer's sites, but deployment had still not been authorized. As it appeared the three-station network would be all that would ever be built, the layout was modified from a triangle to a line by moving the inland position at Bramcote to the existing coastal ROTOR station at Boulmer on the coast. This would maximize the coverage over the V-bomber bases.

It was at this point that Prime Minister Harold Macmillan heard of the plans and demanded they be discussed at a 13 September 1960 cabinet meeting. At the meeting, Macmillan outlined his objections to the system, arguing that its high costs could not be justified by to counter what would be a minor threat by the mid-1960s. In response, Minister of Defense outlined the problem with jamming aircraft:

...since the defense of the deterrent has been abandoned in 1960, air defense was now limited to prevention of intrusion and jamming.

Macmillan called a second meeting on 19 September where he agreed to allow Plan Ahead to continue but only if it was the only air defence radar under development. Blue Joker was cancelled, and Plan Ahead continued.

Macmillan called several additional meetings to discuss the system and whether or not its cost could be reduced. Both the Chief Scientific Advisor to the Ministry of Aviation, Solly Zuckerman, and the Chief Scientist of the Ministry of Aviation, Robert Cockburn added to a report studying Plan Ahead and presented it on 24 November 1960. The report stated that there appeared to be no way to significantly reduce the estimated cost of the system in its present form and still have a useful system; both suggested either building it as-is or cancelling it outright.

Zuckerman went further, pointing out that the coverage during peacetime made the system an excellent way to track civilian aircraft as well, and suggested that Plan Ahead might form the basis for a shared military/civilian air traffic control network. This would allow it to share the costs that would otherwise require two separate networks.

=== Linesman/Mediator ===
Air traffic control (ATC) was an area of interest at the time due to the introduction of the first jetliners. Previously, propeller-driven airliners flew at altitudes on the order of 25,000 feet (7.6 km) and speeds around 250 to 300 miles per hour (400 to 480 km/h). Military aircraft had been flying at much higher altitudes around 40,000 feet (12,000 m) and speeds of about 600 miles per hour (970 km/h). Operators on the ground could tell the types apart at a glance. The RAF was used to having upper airspace to itself and flew where it wished.

This easy separation was upset by the jetliner, which flew at the same speeds and altitudes as military traffic. With the ever-increasing amounts of air traffic in general, there had been a number of close-calls and this was sure to get worse over time. This led to late 1950s plans for a new military air traffic control system.

Meanwhile, the recently formed National Air Traffic Control Service under Laurence Sinclair were planning an extensive network of their own based on the new Decca DASR-1 and Marconi S264 radars. The military and civilian networks overlapped and would need to coordinate their tracking information continually. A 5 December 1960 paper by the Minister of Defense agreed with Zuckerman's concept that the two could be merged, and this was accepted by the Defense Committee on 7 December 1960. At the same meeting, the Committee agreed to start construction of Plan Ahead with the first radar at Neatishead and the MCC at Bawburgh.

To make formal recommendations, the National Air Traffic Control Planning Group was formed, better known as the Patch Committee. In December, each of the stakeholders gave presentations on their prosed systems and areas of overlap, and the Patch Committee was tasked with returning a complete report within six months, in May 1961. The December presentations called for the systems to be merged, which the Treasury used as an excuse to immediately cancel contracts for the work on both Plan Ahead and the civilian systems.

As if this were not enough, an argument soon broke out about the placement of the MCC. The RAF favoured their site at Bawburgh, which was being built into an existing underground bunker complex that had originally been built as part of the ROTOR Phase I and then made redundant when the Type 80 radars were introduced. The RRE, in contrast, favoured abandoning Bawburgh and building the MCC in London, next to the civilian center that would be built at Heathrow Airport. Their logic was that there was no point trying to harden a building in the era of the hydrogen bomb, and by building it next to its civilian counterpart, significant savings in communications equipment could be found.

On 24 January 1961, the argument was finally settled; the MCC and its civilian counterpart would both be moved to a new location in West Drayton. This led to a firestorm of protest within RAF Fighter Command, who pointed out that not only could the site be easily attacked by everything from nuclear weapons to a truck with explosives, but that the communications links that fed information to and from the site could easily be jammed. The argument over this issue raged, but no changes were made in the immediate term.

On 21 February the Treasury released funding for the systems they had paused in December, and on the next day, 22 February, Plan Ahead was formally renamed Linesman while the civilian side became Mediator. At that time a total of twelve stations was planned, with the first S264 radars going in to Heathrow and planned to open in September 1961, with the first Type 85 at Neatishead in mid-1963. A final change was made by moving the prototype Type 84 at RAF Bawdsey originally planned for Saxa Vord to Bishops Court in Northern Ireland, which saved one DASR-1.

=== Installing the systems ===
Funds for the construction of the R12 building at Neatishead were released by the Treasury in March 1961, marking the official start of Linesman construction. Physical installation of the radar began in August 1962 with a planned operational handover sometime in 1964. Production of everything other than the klystrons was progressing well; the klystrons were later downgraded to have a 60 MHz bandwidth, so covering the entire 500 MHz bandwidth would require more transmitters.

By the end of 1962 the mount and turntable were largely complete, but the klystrons remained a problem and now there were delays in the radio equipment that would carry the data to the MCC. By the end of 1963 the system was 80% complete, and the remaining 20% consisted of a number of minor issues that were repeatedly delayed. The initial trials scheduled for July 1964 had to be pushed back to September. The good news was that the Type 84 and passive detection systems were proceeding well.

By the end of 1964 almost all of the equipment had arrived, but the system was now waiting on the buildings. A temporary lash-up allowed the radar components to be tested and the handover date was pushed back to September 1965. The trouble with the turntable introduced another two-month delay, followed by a burst wave-guide that dumped water onto the electronics. (Note: For testing, the waveguides are filled with water as a resistive load and then they can be powered up.) This pushed the handover to November 1965, but by November the system was only just operational and began initial testing. Problems with the turntable and waveguides continued and the handover was continually pushed back three months until it was finally officially handed over on 1 June 1967.

The other sites benefitted from lessons learned from the troubles at Neatishead. Staxton Wold being handed over on 24 January 1968, only a few weeks after its planned 1 January planned date. Boulmer followed on 8 May. The systems, now between four and five years late, were finally complete.

=== Upgrades ===
Although operational within design limits, the three units had a number of minor problems, notably differences in power from beam to beam. Height finding was accomplished by comparing the strength of the return two beams, so differences in beam power skewed these results. This problem was addressed as required over the next two to three years.

Starting in 1961, the RRE began experiments on the Blue Yeoman at the South Site to improve its performance in rain. The reflections off rain vary with the fourth power of wavelength, so the shorter-wavelength 9 cm S-band Type 85 suffered more from this problem than the longer-wavelength 23 cm L-band Type 84, which was one of the reasons for retaining the Type 84. However, by applying the new technique of pulse compression, the RRE system demonstrated a 13 dB improvement in rain conditions with no effect on overall detection capability. A production version became available in 1964.

Also in 1961, the RRE began working on a second system to reduce rain clutter, the use of circularly polarized signals. This had first been experimented with on ROTOR's Type 80s but not fit as the Type 85s were expected shortly. In 1963 they fit a new version of the system to the prototype at the South Site, one that could be easily emplaced or removed for testing. These tests demonstrated an improvement between 12 and 20 dB, however, this had the side-effect of reducing overall detection by 3 dB. Further work on an easily removable filter dragged on, and it was not until the 1970s that these systems were finally applied to the Type 85.

=== Obsolescence ===
By the time the Type 85s, along with the Type 84s and the passive system, were installed and operational, the data collection and forwarding system was itself mired in delays. It was not until 1973 that it reached initial operational capability, and even then it was very limited. This led to questions about the entire Linesman network.

Through this period the strategic environment had changed once again. By the late 1960s the Warsaw Pact had reached some level of parity in both tactical and strategic weapons, and the idea of any aggression on their part being met by a massive nuclear retaliation was no longer reasonable. Wars were now expected to have a long conventional phase, perhaps never "going nuclear". This change had been discussed since 1961 at the NATO level, and was adopted as the official strategy in 1968. With the loss of the tripwire battle concept, Linesman was considered obsolete. Previously, any attack on the UK was assumed to be nuclear, in which case Linesman was essentially disposable as any attack on the sites would have been responded to already and defense was impossible against hydrogen bombs anyway. Now, direct attacks on the sites seemed entirely possible.

Military planners had been complaining about the centralized nature from the moment it had been proposed. The MCC, now officially known as LCC-1, (Note: The original Plan Ahead called for a second station that would have been LCC-2.) had been designed to coordinate a potential country-wide jamming attack, and defend the BMEWS systems and V-force airfields from this jamming. In this new environment, a conventional attack on the LCC-1 was possible, and the radar positioning on the sea-side now appeared to make them extremely vulnerable to an attack by low-flying aircraft. It was also revealed that the communications links were carried via the rather visible BT Tower, only to be replaced by landline systems running in conduits outside the Soviet embassy.

In 1971, two reports outlined the problems with the Linesman concept and called for an expansion of the system and its devolution to distributed control. In particular, the loss of coverage over northern England and Scotland was seen as unacceptable if conventional bombing was a possibility. A rather significant amount of study followed, and in July 1972 a new network was proposed known as UKADGE that would replace Linesman. This retained the three Type 85 systems, while upgrading the stations at Saxa Vord, Buchan and Bishops Court to handle more traffic and provide more complete coverage.

=== Replacement ===
Radar technique was continuing to improve through this era, and a major advance was the introduction of pulse compression in the 1960s, and the development of array antennas that were steered in space using phase shifting. The combination of these techniques allowed a much smaller and simpler radar to provide the same accuracy in measurement as the Type 85. Moreover, the continual improvement in computer systems meant the complex custom systems made for Linesman could now be handled by off-the-shelf computers. The RAF recommended no further fixes to Linesman, and its rapid replacement by what they called the Improved UKADGE.

The new system would consist of several new radars, some of which would be left in storage and only moved into the field and used if the main sites were attacked. Information from the network would be compiled and transmitted between sites using VAX-11/780 computers. The winning radars were the Marconi Martello (as AMES Type 90 and 91) and to a lesser extent the more mobile Plessey AR320 (as AMES Type 93) and a collection of other designs including an AN/TPS-43 captured from the Argentines in the Falklands War. The system ran into extensive delays of its own, and by the time IUKADGE was being installed the Warsaw Pact was dissolving and the system was never fully installed.

=== Byson radar ===
The original prototype at the RRE South Site was no longer actively needed for the Linesman effort as the Neatishead unit began installation. It began to see use as an experimental system known as "Byson" (Note: Apparently based on the first two letters for Blue Yeoman.) and was actively marketed to 3rd party users. In the early 1980s the original transmitters were replaced by two taken from the much smaller Plessey AWS-5 naval radars. Byson remained in use until the 1990s, when radar research moved from Malvern to the Chilbolton Observatory, run by the Rutherford Appleton Laboratory. The transmitters moved but a frequency allocation was not granted so the system was abandoned without being rebuilt at the new location. The antenna and turntable were dismantled on 27 July 2000. An attempt to save the antenna at a museum failed due to cost and it was scrapped. BY Building at South site was demolished in April 2020 as part of the redevelopment of the Malvern site.

== Description ==
=== Physical ===
In order to perform across the wide bandwidth of the Type 85's transmitters, the parabolic reflector antenna had to use a solid surface. (Note: Previous designs like the Type 80 used a surface made of an array of tubes covered in mesh, which limited it to certain frequencies.) This resulted in large wind loads, including the effects of lift when the antenna was turned sideways to the wind. Experiments at the RRE determined that the best solution was to mount a second reflector back-to-back with the first, and this was used on the Type 84. For the Type 85, a partial reflector was applied to the back along with two wing-like "stabilizers" extended backward from the two edges of the main reflector. In front of the reflector was the vertical array of twelve feedhorns, each producing a beam about 1/2 degree wide and 1 degree high. (Note: The main text of Gough states it is 3/8, but the technical description in Appendix F states it is "less than 1/2 degree" and this number is also given in other sources.) To achieve the desired vertical resolution whilst still having low vertical sidelobes, the feedhorns had to be tall enough that they could not be arranged in a single row. Instead, two side-by-side rows of six horns was used, offset by one-half of the horn height. The antenna assembly weighed 110 tonnes.

The antenna was supported on a standardized three-story rectangular building known as an R12, with the antenna turntable on top. The basement contained a dormitory and emergency rations store, the ground floor housed the twelve transmitters, and the top floor held the receivers for the Type 85, the associated IFF gear, and the local half of the RX12874 passive detection gear. The top floor also held two display consoles used by the maintenance crew and various other offices and storage. Among these was Room 27, the system operation room. This was dominated by a "mimic display" that had a schematic diagram of the system with lights and indicators displaying the status of the various parts.

=== Electronics ===
The feedhorns were fed by a series of twelve water-cooled klystrons that could be tuned within 60 MHz of their base frequency. They were divided into four frequency bands, or "octaves", named A, B, D and E. (Note: Gough refers to these as A though D.) Octave C, at 2,900 to 3,000 MHz, was unused by the Type 85 as this frequency was being used by a number of other radars including the Type 80.

Despite this large band gap, the Type 85 was still subject to interference on the receiver side from any nearby transmitter, including the Type 84, even though that worked on very different band. This would cause a pattern of false returns to appear on the display, an effect known as "running rabbits". To address this, the system included a complex "no break trigger" to ensure the radars at any one site used different time slots.

In peacetime operations only four klystrons would be used, two active and two as backups, one each in the A and B octaves. The other octaves were not used in peacetime. With every pulse, the two active klystrons would generate a single preselected frequency within their 60 MHz range and then be mixed together and sent to all twelve feedhorns and produced the classic Cosec² distribution pattern. The result was a signal that contained two frequencies, 100 MHz apart.

In wartime, all twelve klystrons would be used, three in each octave. For each pulse, the three klystrons in octave A would be matched with ones at random in D, and those in B with E, and then sent to one of the feed horns. This way every horn had a separate signal consisting of two frequencies 300 MHz apart. With every rotation of the antenna the allocations were switched, so that with every two rotations every possible frequency in the 500 MHz band would have been used. In jamming conditions, the other transmitters would also be added into the signal, following the same pattern so that every feed horn was fed with a mixture of two frequencies.

In times of extreme jamming, the power could be further improved by setting the antenna to sector scan, thereby greatly increasing the number of pulses hitting the targets and likewise increasing the amount of power returned.

=== Performance ===
In jamming-free conditions, using just two transmitters, the Type 85 was horizon-limited against a 1 m² target, giving it a nominal range of 280 miles (450 km), since the receivers were range gated to 3 ms (300 "Radar Miles"), with the radar horizon at 63,000 feet (19,000 m) altitude. (Note: I do not have access to Gough's book, but as a fully qualified Radar Type 85 fitter, from 1986 until the system was decommissioned, these were the range values we worked with every day. In this case I believe that this is another instance of an error in the "official" source.) This represented a great improvement over the already excellent Type 80's approximate 240 nautical miles (440 km; 280 mi) range.
