= Violet Friend =

British anti-ballistic missile system

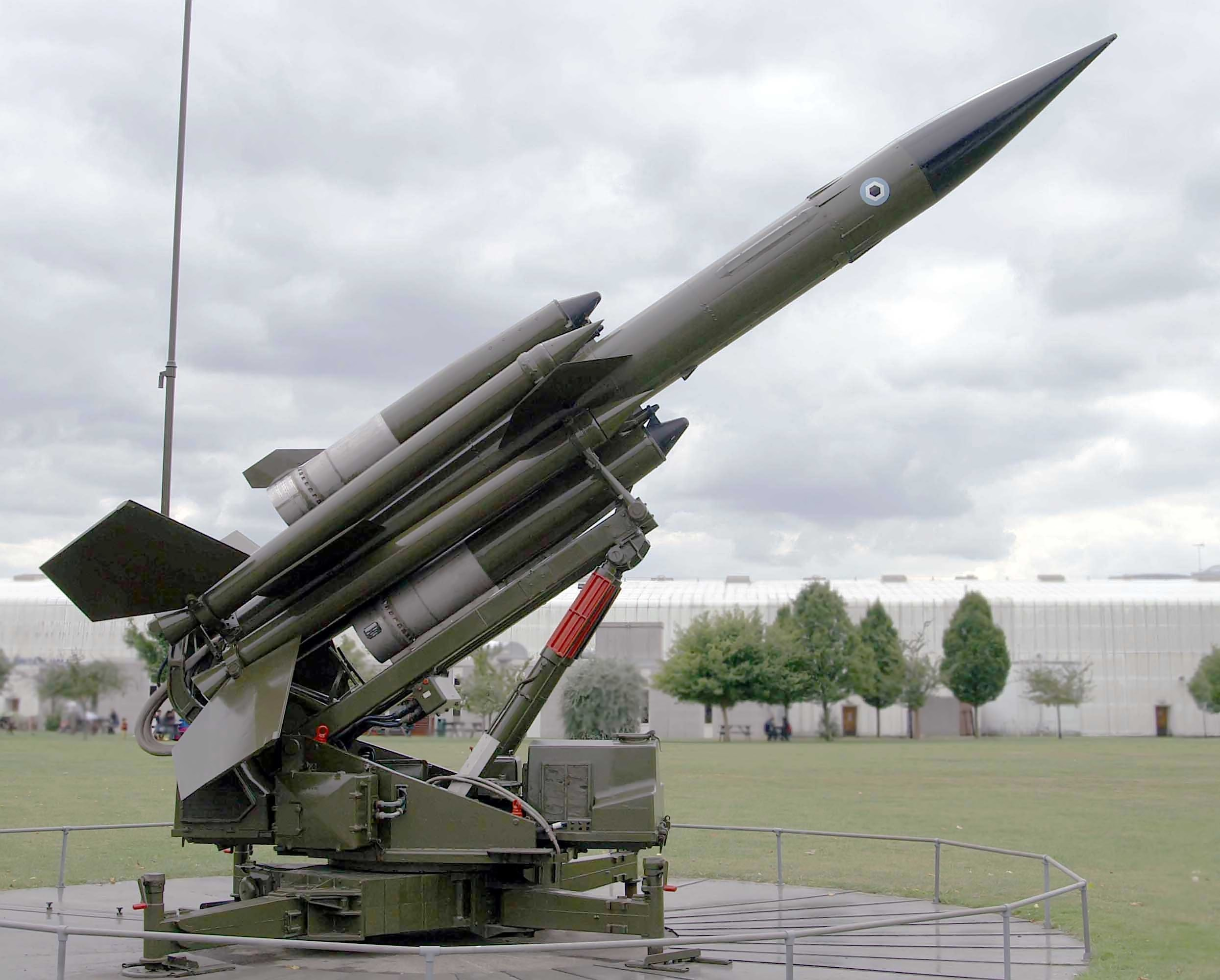
Violet Friend would have used modified versions of the Bloodhound missile to attack ballistic missiles.

Violet Friend was the Ministry of Supply rainbow codename for an anti-ballistic missile (ABM) system developed in the United Kingdom. The project began in 1954 with study contracts for a suitable early warning radar system, which was followed by the February 1955 release of Air Staff Target 1135 (AST.1135) calling for a complete system to counter intermediate range ballistic missiles (IRBMs) being fired at the UK from eastern Europe. AST.1135 required the system to be able to attack six targets at once and be ready for initial deployment in 1963.

After many changes, due both to technical progress and changes in the strategic mission, in 1958 an interim design emerged that used existing missiles and radars to lower development costs. The concept used AMES Type 85 radars in East Anglia for long-range early detection as soon as the missiles rose above the radar horizon. Initial tracking of the warheads would then be handed off to AN/FPS-16 radars in the UK and the Netherlands. As they approached the UK, track information from the FPS-16 would direct an AMES Type 86 fire control radar to begin illuminating each selected target.

The enemy warheads would be attacked by a nuclear-armed Bloodhound Mk. 3, with interceptions taking place between 30,000–40,000 ft (9,100–12,200 m). Due to the short flight times of the ballistic missiles and relatively slow speeds of the Bloodhound, the Bloodhound had to be launched within 30 seconds of the initial early warning. The Bloodhound would at first fly under direct radio control from the ground while the warhead was still too far to be illuminated, and would then do a "jerk" manoeuvre onto the target trajectory once the Type 86 picked it up.

The project took place during an extended debate about the nature of the defence, ongoing since 1947. By the late 1950s, the plan was to move the deterrent from the V bomber fleet to the silo-based Blue Streak IRBM. It was believed the Soviets would be able to directly attack these by about 1970, and an ABM would be needed to retain the deterrent. Protecting the silos required a new ABM with improved performance, but the cancellation of the Blue Streak in 1960 ended much of the system's raison d'être. Ongoing concerns about the size of the Soviet missile fleet and the use of radar decoys led to serious questions about any system's effectiveness. Development largely wound down in 1960, and was formally abandoned in 1965.

== History ==
=== Early studies ===
The UK became the first nation to be subject to attack by ballistic missiles when V-2 missiles began falling on London in 1944. At the time, some consideration was given to attacking them with huge barrages of anti-aircraft artillery fire, but some calculations suggested that dud rounds falling back to the ground presented a greater threat than the missile warheads.

In the immediate post-war era, Henry Tizard was once again called upon to consider the topic of air defence. Promoted to lead the new Defence Research Policy Committee (DRPC), in 1947 he noted: "there is no more likelihood of active defence against rockets of the V.2 type (once they are launched) than there is of defence against a long-range shell." He went to an outside source for a second opinion, which was produced by the Atomic Energy Study Group at Chatham House. They reached similar conclusions, suggesting guns and counter-rockets might "do something... But the proportion brought down could scarcely be considerable." They suggested the only solution was some sort of radio-based weapon. Tizard concluded that "there is none, and no sign of any, practicable defence being developed as yet." and ultimately suggested spending no effort on the issue.

The Air Ministry continued to consider the issue and published something of a counter-note to Tizard's report. They noted that the existing Chain Home radars, then undergoing refits as part of the ROTOR system, could provide two to three minutes warning of an attack from a short-range weapon like the V-2. They also re-considered the topic of AA-guns against missiles, suggesting that modern radars might reduce the number of rounds required to kill a warhead from as much as 1.5 million to as "few" as 18,000. This was not unlike the number needed to bring down a bomber at the start of World War II. Nevertheless, they concluded the only way to ensure a hit on an enemy missile was to use a guided missile of their own, and with those still years off, the only practical solution was to keep the ballistic missiles out of range, deep in Europe.

=== Continuing study ===
In May 1952, as part of a wide review by the Chief of the Air Staff and their counterparts in the British Army, it was agreed that the RAF would be responsible for providing early warning of ballistic missiles. A short time later, the DRPC's Guided Weapons Sub-committee was asked to consider "a GW for defence against V.2 type of attack." This was followed by the Ministry of Supply's Guided Weapons Advisory Board forming a subcommittee to more seriously consider the issue in early 1953.

The committee concluded that early warning could be improved to four to five minutes and that this would reduce the casualties in an attack on London from 118,000 to 30,000. Considering the incoming warheads, they concluded that they could be successfully attacked with conventional high explosive weapons. But they lacked any significant information on the radar signatures for tracking and guidance, passing that topic back to the DRPC. Studies of an actual interceptor rocket were put off until this could be better understood.

As part of the "Ally" conference from 18 to 20 February 1953, the UK and US both presented papers on the topic of missile defence. The US concluded that attacking an ICBM was beyond current capabilities, and came to the same conclusion as the UK in terms of radar signatures. The UK paper considered only the V-2 type missiles, and concluded that the only solution to tracking the missile with the required accuracy was to use semi-active radar homing and that interceptions beyond about 40,000–50,000 yards (37–46 km) were unlikely.

They also concluded that the warhead could be easily modified to strengthen it against attack, noting:

...for a given level of technical development ability, it will be easier to provide a successful attacking missile than a successful defence against it. The only real solution seen is to seize, and maintain, the technical lead in strategic offensive weapons as the only effective deterrent against attack.

=== Increasing concern ===
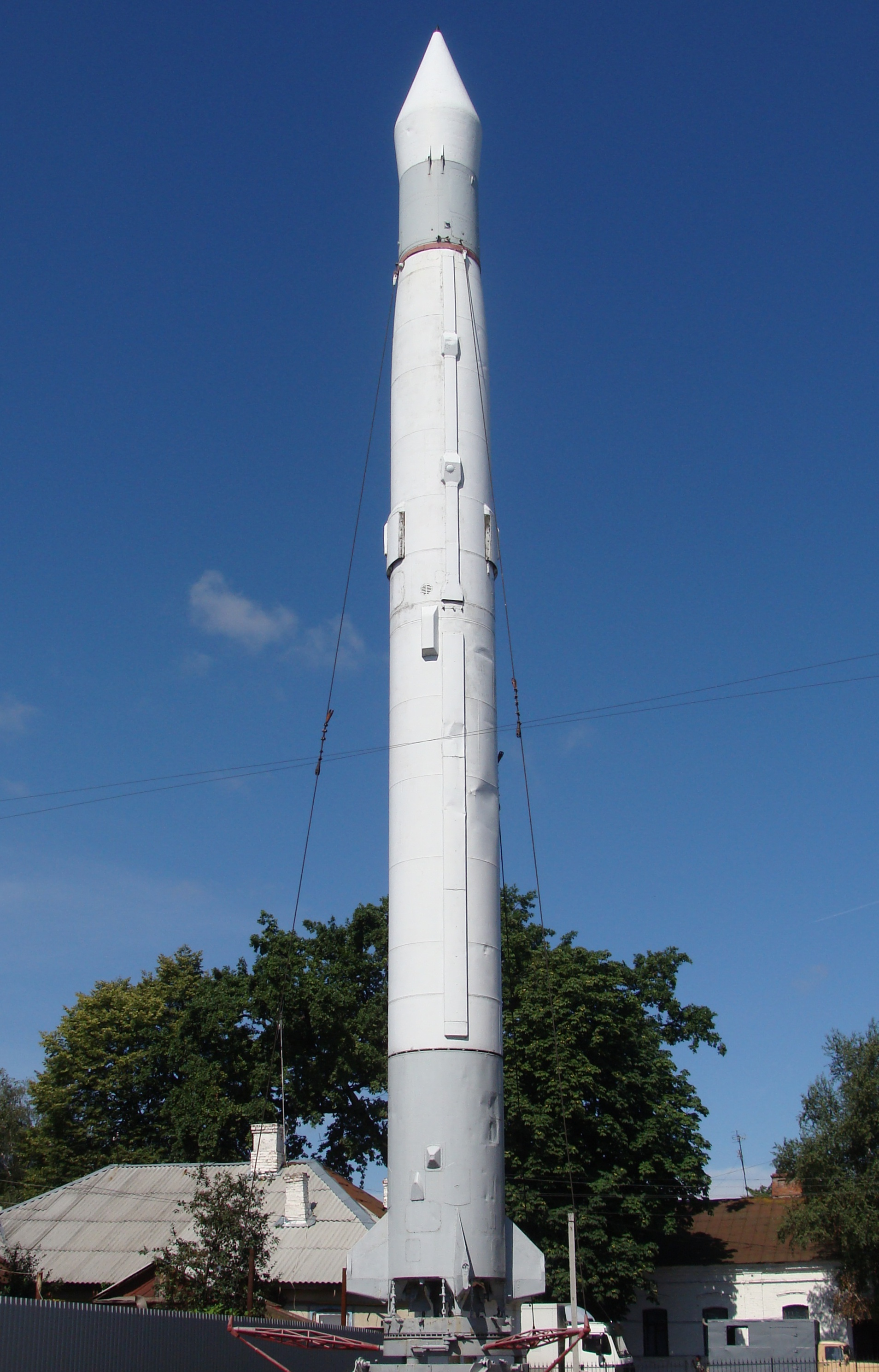
The R-5 was known to be able to reach London from East Germany, and in 1956 was upgraded to hold a nuclear warhead.

Despite this continual, and international, stream of negative reviews of the potential effectiveness of ABMs, in March 1954 another review by the DRPC noted that the issue was becoming more urgent. They stated that while the actual interception remained an area of great uncertainty, there were areas, especially radar, where useful work could begin immediately. By this time, the newly renamed Royal Radar Establishment (RRE) had begun work on radar and infrared detectors that suggested the warning time might be increased to as much as 15 minutes against an attack from a missile with 1,500 miles (2,400 km) range.

A major report by the Air Defence Committee (ADC) in January 1955 stated that short-range missiles were already available to the Soviets and that the UK would come within range of longer-ranged weapons by about 1960. These were apparently references to the 1,200 kilometres (750 mi) range R-5 Pobeda (SS-3 Shyster) which was based in East Germany starting in 1956 and was known by British intelligence to be equipped with chemical weapons and aimed at London. They were additionally aware of the ongoing development of the medium-range R-12 Dvina (SS-4 Sandal) which could reach the UK from western Soviet areas.

The ADC stated that "Although the nuclear deterrent is the prime means of defence, a direct defence should be developed to a significantly high level." The next month, this was formalized as Air Staff Target OR.1135. In response, the Ministry of Supply placed contracts with English Electric and Marconi Electronic Systems to begin studies on an overall defensive system. This marks the official beginning of Violet Friend.

OR.1135 was concerned only with countering weapons with a range over 500 miles (800 km), as it was assumed they could be kept that far from UK shores. This eliminated the need to deal with shorter-ranged weapons like Scud, which had very short flight times. It also ignored conventionally armed weapons, as they believed these did not present a credible threat. Further, the need was to protect only the UK, not overseas locations or the Army in the field. An advanced draft of the OR was sent to Canada, who issued the Canadian General Air Staff Target written along the same lines but aimed only at ICBMs. The Canadians expressed their concerns about a suitable radar being available by 1960/61.

A review of the work by English Electric and Marconi was carried out in December 1955 by the Deputy Director Operational Requirements (DDOR5). The basic outline was a system using a Mach 2 interceptor missile based about 30 miles (48 km) from the defended area, and covering a radius of about 55 miles (89 km). An attack by a total of 150 enemy missiles was assumed. A basic system would require eight bases, but had no redundancy and would provide no coverage over Belfast or Plymouth. A larger system with some redundancy and coverage of those cities and all bomber airfields required fourteen bases. Each site expected to have to attack ten missiles at once.

Considering the smaller deployment, the system required six operations rooms, six early warning radars, 150 tracking radars, 15 launch control sites, 600 launchers and 1,000 missiles. Such a system was estimated to cost £70 million, which was rounded up to £100 million. This was about the same price as the "Stage 1" anti-aircraft system, which was already approved for deployment.

A serious concern was raised at this point; if one assumed that a ballistic missile with a range of 2,000 miles (3,200 km) would cost about £200,000, and based on the assumption that a salvo of four defensive missiles would be fired at each warhead, this meant the defensive volley cost twice as much as its target. They concluded that "the position of the defence tends to be economically unfavourable even in the best case." This basic idea would become a serious concern in the future, when it would be formalized as the cost-exchange ratio, and was ultimately one of the major arguments against a national-scale ABM system being deployed in the US.

=== Design concepts ===
Another international ABM meeting, this time including Canada, was held in London between 18 and 20 January 1956. The UK presented their work to date. A Marconi paper suggested the early warning task was technically possible and went on to consider radar jamming that might make the task considerably more difficult. The general topic of radar jamming became a major concern for the UK, and ultimately led to the RX12874 anti-jamming system that was part of the future Linesman/Mediator radar network of the late 1960s.

A second report by the MoD talked about the use of radar reflectors as decoys in space, suggesting that because they would slow down rapidly in the atmosphere, they could begin to be picked out at about 200,000 feet (61,000 m), but might not be fully distinguished until 75,000 feet (23,000 m). This represented a serious problem for systems like Violet Friend, as there was no way to distinguish the decoys until long after the interceptor missiles had to be launched; the only solution would be to launch a volley of missiles at all the potential targets.

Summing up the meeting, Robert Cockburn noted that the three countries had concepts that were "remarkably close." On the positive side, everyone agreed that radars of the required performance were possible, and that tracking systems of the required accuracy could be developed. It was also noted that there were significant unknowns in the performance of the missile, but there did not appear to be any insurmountable issues. The main concern remained the issues of the vulnerability of the target, and the various decoy systems.

As a result of this meeting, the UK design changed; they no longer felt that a slow missile would be useful, and a new purpose-designed missile would be needed. Several reviews disagreed with this assessment, suggesting that such a system would arrive too late, and would cost too much. Additional comments suggested that the limited defensive role being envisioned was of no use and that every warhead approaching the UK needed to be attacked. The variations and concepts did not seem to be gelling.

=== Violet Friend ===
Late in 1957, the Royal Aircraft Establishment began work with both Bristol Aerospace and Ferranti for alternatives to the EE/Marconi designs. Bristol responded in early 1958 with the first definitive design for such a system. This would use the Red Duster Series 2 Mark 2, later to be known as Bloodhound Mk. 3, combined with the Type 85 radar for early warning, Type 86 for terminal tracking (Note: Gibson and Butler state this would be the Type 83, used with the original Bloodhound Mk. 1 and the Thunderbird Mk. 1. This is almost certainly wrong; by 1957 the Type 86 was already well into development and both the Mk. 2 and Mk. 3 would have used it.) and FPS-16 for midcourse tracking.

In action, the Type 85 would detect the missile while it was launching, and then cue one of the UK-based FPS-16's onto it. These radars would track the booster as it launched, determining the trajectory and probable impact point. The warhead itself proved a difficult target for radar, it was both small and well angled, giving it a very low radar cross section. Thus the warhead would not be tracked directly; instead, the initial tracking would be on the booster, with the assumption that the warhead would be somewhere within a mile of the booster during this stage.

As it approached the UK, the Netherlands-based FPS-16's would then re-acquire the missile as it passed overhead. Looking at the objects from below and to the side meant they had a significantly better view in radar terms, allowing them to pick out the warhead. This information would then be fed back to the UK, where the Type 86 would begin to search and then lock-on to the selected objects.

The Bloodhound would be launched into the estimated reentry area long before the warhead arrived, demanding the tracks be developed rapidly and that it be flown into the target intercept area under ground control. When the Type 86 locked onto the warhead, the missile's internal receiver would pick it up and the missile would do a "jerk" manoeuvre to align with the warhead. The interception would take place as low as 30,000 feet (9,100 m) altitude.

=== Competing approaches ===
Work also continued on the design of a dedicated interceptor missile, with some early work showing a design more similar to the English Electric Thunderbird in basic form, using a solid fuel rocket sustainer and traditional rear-end fins for guidance. Further improvements were considered by using adaptations of the Skylark sounding rocket, or one based on work from the RAE's Missile 8. These more advanced designs would travel anywhere between Mach 5 and Mach 10 (6,100 and 12,300 km/h; 3,800 and 7,610 mph) and push out the interception altitude to 80,000–90,000 feet (24,000–27,000 m). This system would need to be available sometime between 1968 and 1970, when it was estimated that Soviet missiles would have the half-mile accuracy needed to attack a missile silo containing Blue Streak.

In the case of OR.1135, the cost-exchange argument began to swing the decision in favour of a basic system re-using as much existing hardware as possible, as opposed to a dedicated ABM with higher performance. That meant that it could be deployed for less cost, but more importantly, it could cost less to increase the defence if the Soviets responded by building more missiles. On the flip side, if some problem arose, like the addition of high-quality decoys, the program could be cancelled without too much being wasted.

There was also considerable debate over whether the program should upgrade the Bloodhound or purchase the Nike Hercules for this role. Hercules already had a launch-phase command guidance system and thus removed the need to develop a new version of the Bloodhound. On the other hand, it was seen that the development of a nuclear-armed Bloodhound would make it much more lethal against bombers as well, and would be able to be deployed at the Bloodhound bases already under construction.

=== Final concept ===
Ferranti further refined the interim concept, suggesting that six existing launch sites for Bloodhound Mk. 1 were suitable conversion to Mk. 3, and these would cover most of the bomber bases. These would be supported by two FPS-16 sites in the Netherlands and four Type 85's, two each at two separated control sites.

The RRE then added their own comments, suggesting the system be deployed at sixteen sites, ten of them existing Mk. 1 and Mk. 2 sites and six new ones. This would provide complete coverage over all the RAF's bomber airbases, sixteen Thor IRBM sites, and seven US airbases. To be effective they suggested being able to attack six targets at once, which would require five Type 85's, six FPS-16's in the Netherlands, and eight more in the UK. This could be ready by 1963 if the Type 85 radar were ready by that time. (Note: It was not, the Type 85 did not enter RAF service until 1968.) They put the price at £1.46 million for development and £12.5 million for deployment, although that included funds already allocated for the anti-aircraft sites.

=== Active defence ends ===
In 1959, Harold Watkinson took over the Ministry of Defence (MoD), and Duncan Sandys returned to the Ministry of Aviation. Watkinson instituted a sweeping review of ongoing projects. Blue Streak was cancelled in April 1960, largely because they felt it would not represent a credible deterrent once Soviet missiles could attack the silos directly. A new report by the Ministry of Aviation following the cancellation noted:

Blue Streak was abandoned largely because it was adjudged vulnerable to attack by 300 rockets arriving on the UK within a period of a minute...it would appear reasonable to take that scale of attack as at least a broad indicator of what an anti ballistic missile defence would have to cope with. Judged by this standard we do not consider that an effective defence is likely to emerge within any foreseeable period.

Active defence remained an area of study for the next few years, although little funding was provided for anything outside early warning systems. A January 1961 release by the Powell Committee, set up in 1959 to consider the entire deterrent question, examined the issue again and concluded that attacking warheads that were not accompanied by decoys remained possible, but that the presence of decoys would so upset the economic balance that the entire concept "foundered".

What emerged as the final major look at the topic was published by the Ministry of Defence under the direction of the RRE's William Penley. The Penley Report's conclusions were much the same as Powell's, noting that operating against warheads appeared a solved problem, but "in the face of decoys, discrimination becomes well nigh impossible." A supporting paper outlined many of the technical details, including the suggestion that conventional warheads might be used in future interceptors, and then going on to consider lasers, radio beams, and electron and proton beams. All faced "fundamental problems."

A final note was offered by the Air Ministry while commenting on the Penley report: "The overall policy of nuclear deterrence is based on the main assumption that a viable defence against ballistic missile attack is not possible now, nor can be foreseen to be possible at any given future date".

The AST.1135 was planned to be superseded by an actual development contract under Air Staff Requirement (ASR) 1155, but this was never issued. AST.1135 was officially cancelled in June 1965.

== Description ==
=== Early warning ===
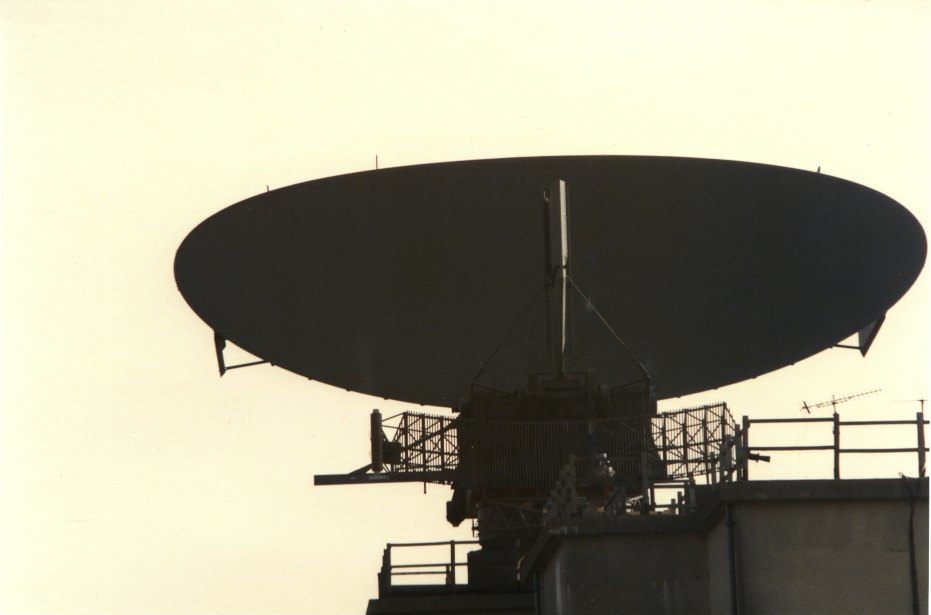
The Type 85, originally for aircraft tracking, would provide early warning in Violet Friend.

The entire Violet Friend system was highly reliant on the earliest possible warning of an attack. A radar in the UK mounted at 15 metres (49 ft) like the Type 85 had a radar horizon against a missile at 100 kilometres (62 mi) altitude at just over 1,300 kilometres (810 mi). (Note: Well within Poland.) Several Type 85s were to continually scan the horizon to look for launches, feeding this information both to their associated battery as well as to each other via datalink. Later plans called for one of the sites at RAF Watton.

=== Tracking ===
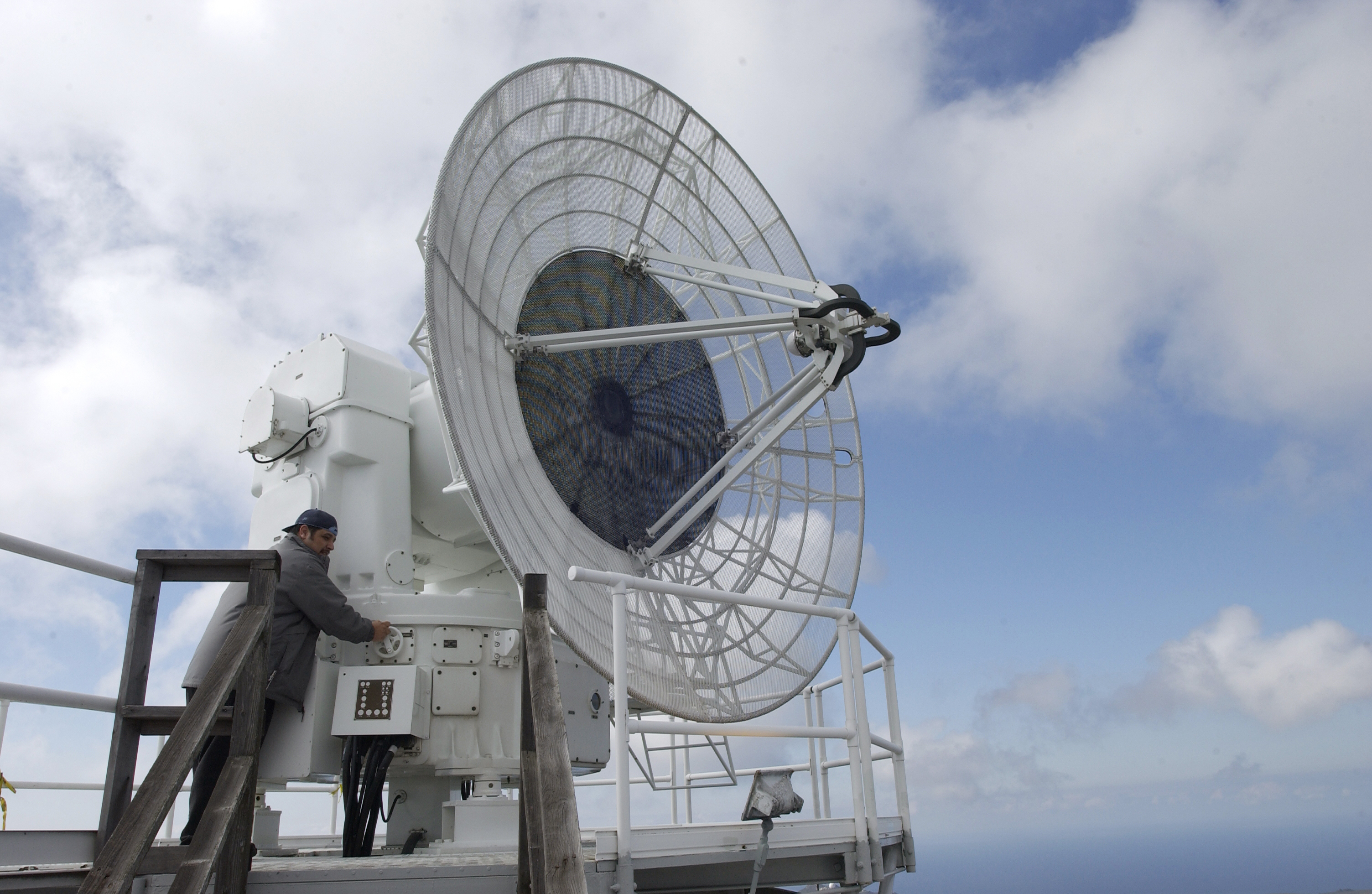
The FPS-16 was designed to provide highly accurate tracks for missile test ranges, making it perfectly suited to quickly generating tracking information to feedback to the Violet Friend control centres.

As the interceptor missile had to be launched shortly after detection and had to place itself relatively close to the ultimate intercept location, detailed tracking information was required as early as possible. To arrange this, radars would be forward deployed in the Netherlands at two sites, one in the south near Terneuzen and the second in the north on the island of Terschelling. These would be able to look sideways at the missiles as they passed, giving them an excellent image of the warheads and boosters. It was assumed the booster would be the primary signal and that the warhead would be within a mile of it.

To achieve the accuracy needed, the system would use the FPS-16 radar. This was originally designed as an instrumentation radar used at missile testing sites to provide highly accurate information for performance measurements. It was an early monopulse radar design, using this technique to achieve higher accuracy than earlier conical scanning systems. The use as an active missile tracking system in Violet Friend was somewhat novel.

When the early tracking information was achieved, the interceptor missile was launched as soon as could be, on a course that would take it as close to the estimated location of the warhead as possible. As the warhead continued its approach to the UK, it would become more easily visible as it descended. In some versions of the system, a second set of FPS-16's in the UK would then attempt to lock onto the warhead during this phase. In either event, Type 86 missile guidance radars would be used to pick up the warhead and the missile would see this signal as soon as it locked on.

=== Missile ===
At the time Violet Friend was first being considered, the Bloodhound missile was still in development and known by its rainbow code Red Duster. Red Duster was a relatively short-range system, with a maximum effective range on the order of 35–40 miles (56–64 km). Red Duster was designed to fill an interim "Stage 1" deployment while waiting for a much longer-ranged "Stage 2" design, Blue Envoy. When Red Duster later entered production it was given the name Bloodhound.

Blue Envoy was cancelled in 1957 as attention turned from bombers to missiles. By that time several components of the system had been developed and tested. It was decided to fold these technologies into Red Duster to produce Bloodhound Mk. 2. The larger engines from the Blue Envoy allowed the weight to be increased, which was put to use by extending the fuselage to add more fuel tanks. This extended the range to a respectable 75 miles (121 km) in a system that was otherwise very similar to the original design. Additionally, the new continuous wave radars, mainly the Type 86, gave the system much better performance against jamming.

It was right as the Mk. 2 was being designed in 1957 that Bristol was invited to join the Violet Friend program. Their proposal was based on a further modified version of the Mk. 2. The original designs used semi-active radar guidance, with the targets being continually illuminated by the Type 86 and a receiver in the missile using that signal for guidance. In the ABM role, the missile would have to be launched long before the enemy warhead arrived, so this required a new ground-based command guidance system to be used during the launch phase. The combination of this new guidance system and a small nuclear warhead produced the Bloodhound Mk. 3.

With these exceptions, the Mk. 3 was otherwise similar to the Mk. 2, and the Mk. 1 before it. They could all be launched from the same missile launchers, and used the same radars. In the ABM role the launch control would be remote and have ties to other radars as well, but the overall system was otherwise similar. A key aspect of the system was a fast reload time so the enemy's follow-up salvos could be attacked.

For the warhead, several designs were considered, the ~6 kT Indigo Hammer, the smaller Pixie, and the similar-sized Wee Gwen, a UK version of the W54 "Wee Gnat" of the US's Davy Crockett.

== See also ==
- Comparison of anti-ballistic missile systems
