= Winkel (surname) =

Winkel is a Dutch and Low German toponymic surname. While winkel means "shop" in modern Dutch, its original meaning was "corner" or "enclosed piece of land", and the surname is thought to be toponymic only. Among multiple places named (de/'t) Winkel, Winkel, North Holland is known to be at the origin of several families with the name. Variant forms include De Winkel, Te Winkel, Van Winkel, Van de Winkel, Winckel, Winkels and Aus dem Winckel. People with these surnames include:

- Adrian P. Winkel (1915–1994), American politician, High Commissioner of the Trust Territory of the Pacific Islands
- Ashley van Winkel (fl. 1996), South African lawn bowler
- Bob Winkel (born 1955), American football player
- Cees Jan Winkel (born 1962), Dutch freestyle swimmer
- Corrie Winkel (born 1944), Dutch backstroke swimmer
- Dietrich Nikolaus Winkel (1777–1826), German-born Dutch inventor of the metronome
- Frederik Winkel-Horn (1756–1837), Danish writer
- Frederik Winkel Horn (1845–1898), Danish historian and translator
- Gary Winkel (born 1938), American environmental psychologist
- Jan te Winkel (1847–1927), Dutch linguist and philologist, unrelated to Lambert
- Joanna van de Winkel (born 1982), South African road bicycle racer
- Johannes Winkel (born 1991), German politician
- Lambert Allard te Winkel (1809–1868), Dutch linguist and lexicographer, unrelated to Jan
- Leo Winkel (1885–1981), German architect
- Mogens Winkel Holm (1936–1999), Danish composer
- Nate Winkel (born 1978), American soccer midfielder
- Paul van Winkel (born 1953), Belgian wheelchair racer
- Petrus Wijtse Winkel (1909–2012), Dutch colonial administrator in the Dutch East Indies
- Rick Winkel (born 1956), American (Illinois) politician and lawyer
- Therese Winkel ( (1784 – 1867) German author, composer, and harpist
- Torsten de Winkel (born 1965), German musician, composer, and philosopher

Winckel

- Franz von Winckel (1837–1911), German gynecologist and obstetrician
- Gus Winckel (1912–2013), Dutch military officer and pilot
- Jan Van Winckel (born 1974), Belgian football coach

== See also ==
Van Winkle, Anglicized form of the surname "Van Winkel"
