= AMES Type 82 =

Cold War-era British medium-range 3D radar

- Type 82 at RAF Lindholme
- Country of origin: UK
- Manufacturer: Marconi
- Introduced: 1957
- No. built: 5
- Type: tactical control
- Frequency: S band, 3 GHz
- PRF: 750
- Beamwidth: 1.5º horizontal, ~30º vertical
- Pulsewidth: 2 μS
- RPM: 12 (later 8)
- Range: 150 nmi (280 km; 170 mi)
- Altitude: 60,000 ft (18,000 m)
- Diameter: 45 ft (14 m)
- Azimuth: 360º
- Elevation: 0–27.5º
- Precision: 1,500 ft (460 m) or better
- Power: 1.5 MW
- Other names: Orange Yeoman; AA No. 4 Mk. 8?

The AMES Type 82, also widely known by its rainbow codename Orange Yeoman, was an S-band 3D radar built by the Marconi Company and used by the Royal Air Force (RAF), initially for tactical control and later for air traffic control (ATC).

Development started in 1949 at the British Army's Radar Research and Development Establishment to provide medium-range early warning for up to sixteen anti-aircraft artillery (AAA) batteries. Early in the program, the team saw the Royal Navy's Comprehensive Display System, and adapted it as the Data Handling System. This provided a semi-automated track while scan function that allowed operators to handle larger numbers of aircraft.

The system was originally designed to support AAA guns by passing data on a selected target to point (or "put on") the AAA's local gun laying radar. In 1953 the RAF took over the air defence role and began to move from guns to the new Bloodhound missile. They also took over the design work and gave the system the Type 82 name. The first prototype began operation that year and a second was briefly used in 1955 before being moved to the UK east coast as an operational unit in 1957. Three production units were added in 1960.

The Type 82 was withdrawn from the tactical control role in January 1963, as the data it provided for Bloodhound was now available from other radars like the AMES Type 80s. They were then repurposed as air traffic control systems, where its ability to measure range, bearing, elevation and secondary radar information in a single unit was a major advantage over previous systems. During this period they were manned by military and civilian operators. In spite of their increasing age, three of the systems lasted into the 1980s and '90s in this role.

== History ==
=== Earlier systems ===
During World War II, the British Army had a number of radar systems used in the anti-aircraft warfare role. These included the "Gun Laying" (GL) radars that provided short-range highly-accurate aiming information, and the "Tactical Control" (TC) radars that fed less accurate but longer-range information to the GL units. It was difficult to combine these two roles into a single radar; the accuracy of the GL role required a very thin pencil beam, which was not useful for scanning large volumes of the sky in the search role.

One of the most successful of the TC radars was a Canadian design known as the Zone Position Indicator (ZPI) that was taken into operational use as the AA No. 4 Mark IV. This was developed using the electronics of the ASV Mk. II radar combined with a rotating radar antenna and custom display system. By the late-war period, the same developers had produced a model using a cavity magnetron known as the Microwave Zone Position Indicator (MZPI). The British Army purchased 150 of these sets as the AA No. 4 Mark VI, and they were delivered shortly after the war ended.

These units, and similar designs from the UK, had the problem that they did not indicate altitude. This was not a concern during the war because the information would be handed off to nearby gun-laying radars, which could determine the altitude by scanning up and down once provided with an angle to look at. As the range of the TC radars grew and they became more distant from the multiple widely dispersed gun-laying radars they worked with, some indication of altitude would be needed to help the GLs in their initial pointing. This could be accomplished by a separate height finding radar, but a single radar that could provide reasonably accurate direction and altitude would make this process easier.

=== 3D development ===
The Radar Research and Development Establishment (RRDE), who handled the development of radars for the Army, began exploring the idea of a 3D radar that could measure the vertical angle of the target at the same time as its bearing and range. Their solution was to split the signal into several waveguides and feed horns that were positioned in a vertical stack. Each one had a reception pattern a few degrees wide vertically, and by careful arrangement, they could be overlapped so their half-power points were lined up. The echo of a target would be received by two of these feeds at any given time, and by comparing the relative signal strengths, the elevation angle could be determined to well under a degree.

Serious work on the concept began in 1947, first with a mechanically spiral-scanned X-band system, and later, various experiments with stacked feeds. At the same time, research began on the design of a new high-power 25 cm wavelength (L-band) cavity magnetron, a new large-format long-persistence plan-position indicator display tube, and a data link system to send the information to as many as sixteen remote sites. By mid-1948 the basic design was complete; it would operate in the X-band at 10 cm wavelength and use ten feedhorns, each one with a 3 degree vertical beam.

To test the concept, an experimental five-beam system was operational in 1949. This used the MZPI as the transmitter and a separate lens-type receiver array. The lens consisted of short metal cylinders open on both ends and aligned with the target, or boresight. Many such cylinders were arranged to make a large grid. Radio signals travelling through the open centres of the tubes slow down, and by cutting the tubes to different lengths, the wavefront of the signal can be focused down like a traditional optical lens. At the focal point were the five receiver feed horns. The lens was synchronized to turn at the same speed as the MZPI.

=== Orange Yeoman ===
In 1949 the Ministry of Supply took over direct control of the TRE and RRDE, and assigned the 3D work the Rainbow Code "Orange Yeoman". By the end of the year the system appeared to be progressing well, with the antenna design completed and a system to feed the ten signals through a series of slip-rings successfully tested. To produce more power in total, a system was developed to feed three magnetrons in parallel. A new foldable antenna was also being tested.

Meanwhile, the RAF was beginning to consider the problem of long-range fighter direction and developed a requirement for a new system to be operational by 1957. The Royal Navy had been developing its own 3D radar in this period, the Type 984 radar, and in May 1950 there was some consideration of whether or not it should be used in the RAF as well. In June 1950, the Defence Research Policy Committee studied whether the 984 or Orange Yeoman might better fill the requirement. They asked the War Office and Admiralty to consider whether a single radar would be useful for both fighter control and gun direction; fighter control demanded long range which suggested a slower scanning rate than what would be ideal for a GL radar whose primary concern is rapid notifications in changes of location.

Through this period there was a growing interest in moving from anti-aircraft guns to surface-to-air missiles, or as they are known in the UK, surface-to-air guided weapons, or SAGW. There was increasing interest in Orange Yeoman as a system to help direct these weapons, which were expected to be available in the mid-to-late 1950s. Likewise, a new GL radar under development as Yellow River was ultimately redirected to be the radar illuminator for these missiles rather than as a replacement for the AA No. 3 Mark VII used with AAA. AAA would remain in use through a transition period, and there was a desire to accurately feed the information from Orange Yeoman to their existing Mark VII radars. This led to a requirement for Orange Yeoman to have an 80% probability of producing a track that was accurate to within 500 yards (460 m) in position and altitude.

As the development of the antenna system appeared to be progressing well, in 1950 it was decided to add another feed horn while decreasing the beam width to 2.5 degrees. This gave a total vertical coverage of 27.5 degrees in eleven beams. However, by this time other problems appeared. A major one was that the planned S-band magnetron, the BM 735, was only available in small numbers and would rarely work when pushed beyond 1 MW of its 2 MW rated power. Additionally, the slip-ring system for feeding radio frequency power to the antenna also continued to be a problem. This led to experiments with slip-rings that fed the intermediate frequency (IF) instead, with the magnetron transmitters and first stages of the superheterodyne receivers on the rotating platform.

In June 1951, with these problems ongoing, it was decided to move ahead with all the parts that did work in order to get a production system as soon as possible. This led to a system using a single 2 MW magnetron instead of three ganged ones, feeding them via IF slip-rings, and using separate transmit and receive antennas. Metropolitan-Vickers (Metrovick) was contracted to build a test system, which consisted of a gantry framework with two turntables at different altitudes, the lower one with the transmitter antenna and the receiver above it. The complete system was working for the first time in 1953.

=== Data Handling System ===
From 1948, there had been ongoing experimentation with a new display system that stored radar data over subsequent "sweeps" and then extracted tracking information from that data. This would provide track while scan capability that would greatly ease the task of deciding which AA guns should be trained on which targets. There was also some experimentation with sending this data to control centers using voice quality telephone lines.

Near the end of 1949, the RRDE staff were shown the ongoing work on the Comprehensive Display System being developed for the Navy by Elliott Brothers. This quickly led to a project to modify the same basic system to the needs of the AA Command. The main change was the ability to take a location measurement and then offset it by a constant value before calculating the azimuth, to account for the AA guns being located some distance from the radar. This was not needed in the original version where the guns were located on the same ship as the radar. This change led to the Data Handing System project, which had delivered the individual components by the end of 1950. A complete system was built at the RRDE with help from Metrovick and British Thomson-Houston during 1951, which was able to track up to 12 targets and had two large-format displays for the direction officers. A larger system with 36 tracks was built and connected to the prototype Orange Yeoman during 1952.

At first, the system required the operators to update the information for a given track by watching the radar display and moving a cursor dot with a joystick. Due to the desired rate of updates, this required a dedicated operator for every six tracks. This was later improved by the addition of a double-integrator which could automatically update the tracks as long as the aircraft did not change its course. This greatly reduced the number of manual updates required and allowed the same number of operators to track a much larger number of aircraft. A second group injected height measurements into the storage system at a slower pace, as changes in altitude were much less frequent, so only two or three operators were required for this task. This "Analysis Group" also handled the identification friend or foe (IFF) system. Finally, an "Accurate Tracking Group" would pick targets from the store for longer-term, more accurate measurements, using that data to feed off to the GL radars at the gun sites.

=== Type 82 ===
By early 1953, development was largely complete and the system was given the official name Radar, Anti-Aircraft, Number 4, Mark VIII, or AA No. 4 Mk. VIII for short. Three locations, London, Liverpool and Southampton, were selected for operational units, with their primary role being to hand off data to the Yellow River radars, now known as Radar, Anti-Aircraft, Number 3, Mark V or AA No.3 Mk.V. In June 1953, the first of these sites was selected, on the hills near Newton overlooking the Frodsham Anti-Aircraft Operations Room covering the Liverpool area and relatively close to the Metrovick works. It was paired with six gun sites, Crank (MY10), Thurstaston (MY24), Norley (MY39), Flint (MY45), Altcar (MY66) and Penketh (MY76).

In 1953 the RAF took over responsibility for anti-aircraft missiles, with the ultimate goal of removing large-calibre AAA from UK service at some time in the future. The Army would retain their smaller-calibre AAA and missiles for defence in the field, but would no longer be tasked with the defence of the UK. As part of this handover, Orange Yeoman became a TRE project and was assigned the name AMES Type 82, although the actual development remained at the normally Army-related RRDE.

The RAF initially saw a role for the Orange Yeoman similar to that of the Army, and continued development of two prototypes and three production sites. In 1955, a series of tests using the Orange Yeoman and Data Handling System at Malvern and a Yellow River radar located 30 miles (48 km) away to the north succeeded in automatically directing the Yellow River onto a target aircraft with a 100% success rate with no intervention by the operators of the Yellow River. The Frodsham site was operational by September and took part in that year's BEWARE military exercises, where it proved very successful.

=== Carcinotron ===
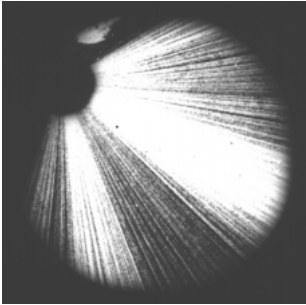
The carcinotron filled the screen with noise that made tracking almost impossible. At the time, it appeared it might render all ground-based long-range radars useless.

In 1950 a new type of microwave-frequency vacuum tube known as the carcinotron was introduced by the French company CSF. It was revealed publicly in the IEEE in 1953. The carcinotron was unique in that its output frequency could be changed across a wide band by changing the input voltage. This allowed it to sweep through an entire selected band so rapidly that it appeared to be a constant radiator at all frequencies. Although it output only a few watts, compared to a million times that from the radar's transmitter, the radar equation meant that its output was larger than the return from the radar signal being reflected off the aircraft.

A sample was purchased from CSF and fit to a Handley Page Hastings known as "Catherine" in 1954. In tests it was found to produce a solid signal on the Type 80 display even when it was under the radar horizon. At long range, an Avro Lincoln had to be 20 miles (32 km) away from the jammer before it cleared the effect and became visible, meaning a single jammer could easily hide an entire formation of aircraft. At closer ranges, the signal began to be picked up in the antenna's side lobes, eventually causing the entire screen to be filled with noise. These tests appeared to suggest that the carcinotron would make long-distance radars useless, and interest in using Orange Yeoman as a tactical radar during wartime disappeared.

The Central Flying School expressed their interest in the Data Handling System as a way to simplify their fighter interception duties. This led to further development of the prototype system at RRDE through 1954 and 1955, adding displays to plan interceptions directly on the screens. However, by this time the AMES Type 80 had undergone a number of improvements that gave it the capability to guide fighters, and the need for a separate system to provide this capability disappeared.

There was also an effort to interest the civilian air traffic control authorities in the system, especially for the experimental Northern Air Traffic Control Center being set up in Preston, Lancashire outside Liverpool. However, the cost of maintaining the complex system was well beyond their budget, even if the radar was given to them for free. The idea went no further at the time.

=== Deployment ===
As the RAF began to study various air war scenarios, it became clear any sort of comprehensive air defence was hopeless in an era where a single bomber could destroy an entire city. They abandoned the idea of general anti-aircraft operations and began to focus entirely on the defence of the deterrent force in the form of the V bomber fleet. For this role the inland site at Frodsham was not needed as no missiles would be based in the area. It remained operation for a few years for training.

RAF North Coates was eventually selected as the second site in 1955, where it could provide coverage over the airfields in the Midlands area. This was a prototype station, so the radar from Frodsham was dismantled and sent there, long before the buildings were complete. In the summer of 1957 the system was given the Type 82 name, and Yellow River became Type 83 a few months later. The system was completed in early 1957, and acceptance trials were completed in the summer as OR.2094.

The need to tie the Type 82 data into the overall ROTOR network was obvious, and work on this concept continued through the next two years. The first production version of the system became operational in the middle of 1960 at RAF Watton, and two additional units at RAF North Luffenham and RAF Lindholme.

=== Air Traffic Control ===
In 1963, the Type 82's were withdrawn from the Bloodhound missile mission. By this time the Type 80s were covering the same area, and there was concern that the carcinotron would render the Type 82 useless in a war anyway. The Bloodhound units were then connected to the Master Radar Stations at RAF Patrington and RAF Bawdsey, which were upgraded to provide this information. As the Type 80 was just as susceptible to jamming, this move was a temporary one until the Linesman/Mediator system was operational, at that time expected in 1968.

Within a few months of the Type 82's being stood down, the Vice-Chief of the Air Staff completed a study on "Conversion of the Tactical Control Centres at Watton, North Luffenham and Lindholme to an ATC role". They noted that this area was largely uncovered by ATC radars, contained 38 airfields with 75,000 runway movements a month, and that 90% of all the near-miss incident reports were filed in this area. The suggestion was accepted in June 1963.

Little change was required for the switch to the ATC role, but the chance was taken to convert the antennas to circular polarization, which RRE experiments had demonstrated reduced the clutter from rain and hail. Servicing of the systems passed to civilian contractors, and they were manned by both military and civilian air traffic controllers. They remained in service in this role at least into the 1980s and possibly 1990s.

== Description ==
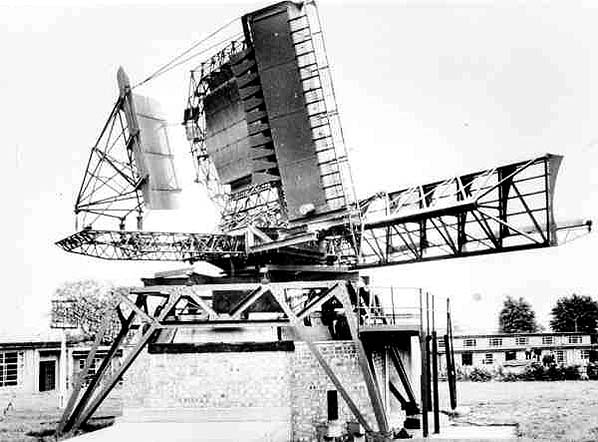
The Orange Yeoman prototype built at the RRDE in Malvern lacks the IFF antenna on top, but is otherwise typical of the operational systems. On the right is the transmitter, above it the lens, on the left is the reflector, and on the near side of the lens are the eleven receiver feed horns.

=== Antenna arrangement ===
The Type 82 had separate antennas for transmitting, receiving and handling reception of IFF signals.

The transmitter consisted of a slotted waveguide in front of a cosecant-squared linear reflector 45 feet (14 m) wide by 5 feet (1.5 m) high. This produced a fan-shaped beam that was narrow horizontally and covered about 30 degrees vertically.

Above and behind the transmitter was the main receiver. This was a hexagonal array of metal tubes acting as a lens that separated the reflected signal into a series of vertically stacked stripes, 2.5 degrees wide. The signal was focussed on a rodded reflector behind the lens that provided the horizontal focusing, narrowing it to 1.5 degrees. The signal reflected to the back of the lens, as seen from above, where a series of eleven vertically stacked feed horns received the now-focused signal.

The IFF antenna was also a slotted waveguide, positioned above the receiver array.

The system originally used a smaller transmitter with a wider beam, and rotated at 24 RPM. It was later equipped with the larger transmitter antenna, and its rate was reduced to 12 RPM. During the conversion to the ATC role, the rate was reduced again to 8 RPM.

At some point, a new and much simpler antenna arrangement was produced for the system, and one image shows it on the system at RAF Watton. This version used a parabolic reflector with a single transmitter horn and the vertical receiver horns arranged on an arm in front of the "dish". The IFF antenna moved to the bottom of the arm. To avoid the curved back of the dish producing lift and pulling the antenna off its mount in high winds, two "wings" extended rearward behind the dish. An enlarged version of the same antenna design was later used for the Blue Yeoman radar.

=== Electronics ===
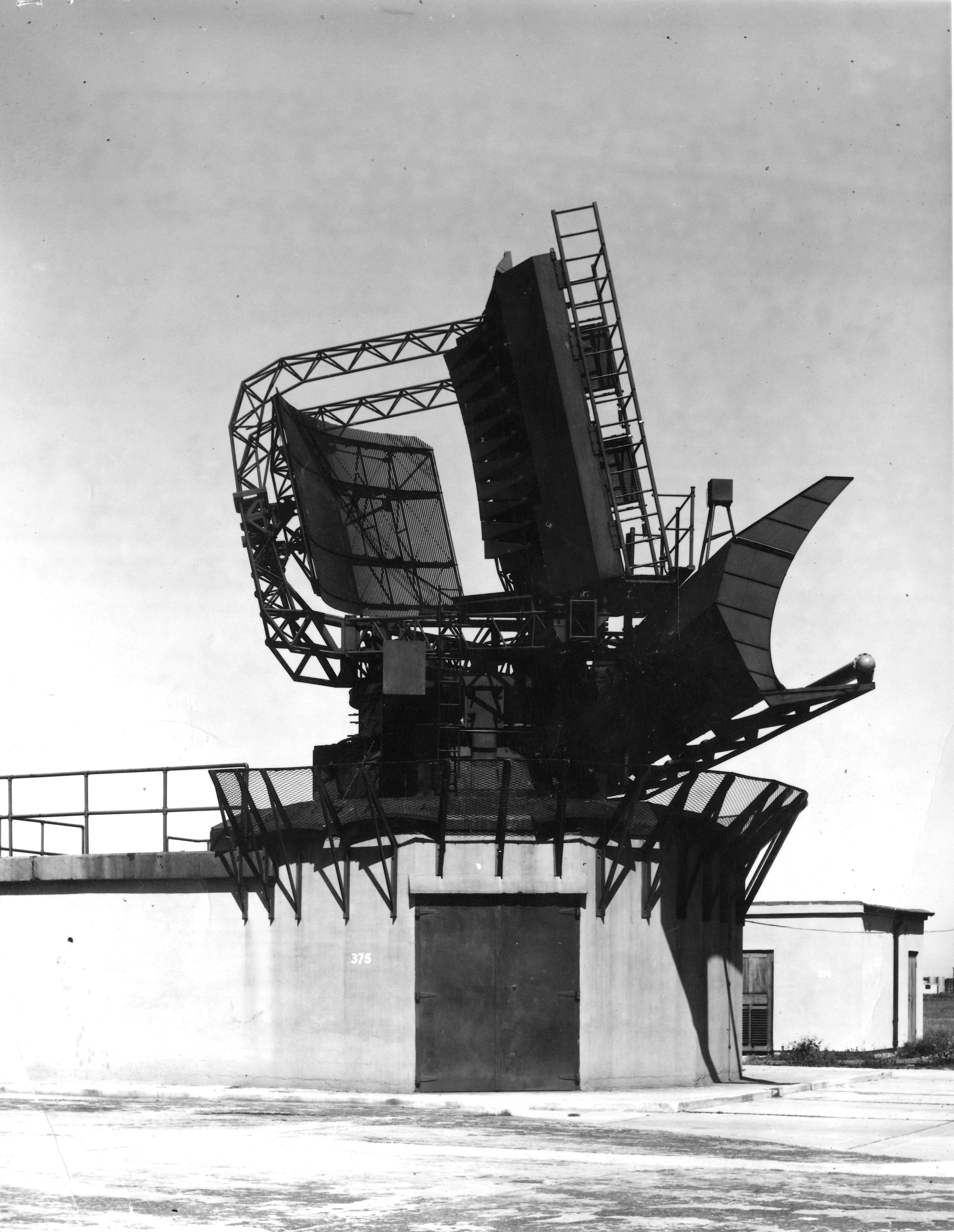
The Type 82 at RAF North Coates was mounted on a shorter platform than other production sites. Note the differences in layout from the prototype version at Malvern. The near end of the IFF antenna is the small triangle on top of the lens.

The transmitter was a magnetron that produced pulses of 1.5 MW at 3 GHz with a pulse repetition frequency (PRF) of 750 pulses per second and a pulse length of 2 microseconds.

=== Performance ===
The Type 82 was designed to measure bearing, range and elevation with enough accuracy to place a target return within a 1,500 foot (460 m) box. In testing, it demonstrated a 95% chance of placing the target within 650 yards (590 m) horizontally, and 550 yards (500 m) in altitude. It had a maximum range of about 150 nautical miles (280 km; 170 mi).

=== Displays and interpretation ===
The Type 82 was notable for its use of the Data Handling System, one of the earliest examples of computerized radar handling, albeit in a semi-automatic and analog form. Positions were recorded by capacitors with 150 V representing a range of 150,000 yards (140,000 m) in military use, and 150 miles (240 km) for ATC use.

Initial data for a track was entered by two dedicated Track Allocators who considered only the outermost regions of the plan-position indicators. Return blips that they found interesting were strobed, which caused the system to record the location in one of 18 stores dedicated to each Allocator, for a total of 36 tracks.

Each set of 18 tracks for one Allocator was split among three Trackers, who would see the allocator's selected blips appear on their display. They would then begin tracking the target by moving the joystick so their on-screen cursor remained on top of the blip as it moved from sweep to sweep. This action updated the values in the store so they maintained an accurate location. Every time the value was updated, the previous value was copied to a second store. By comparing the two values, the direction and speed of the target was calculated.

The Trackers also had their own strobing system that could hand off a target for IFF checks and altitude measurements. They would select a particular track by pressing a switch on their display, sending that value to the altitude or IFF screens. Those operators would then take the required measurement and feed it back into a separate store that would make that data appear on the Tracker's console.

Altitude measurement was carried out on a custom display. This displayed the signals from two adjacent beams on a single line on the display, with ten such lines. When the Trackers strobed a target, only those signals would appear on the altitude display, causing two blips to appear on each line. By comparing the relative length of the two blips, the operator could estimate the altitude.
