= Winkel =

Winkel may refer to:

== Places ==
- Winkel, Belgium
- Winkel, Haut-Rhin, France
- Winkel, Oestrich-Winkel, Germany
- Winkel, Rhineland-Palatinate, Germany
- Winkel, Saxony-Anhalt, Germany
- Winkel, North Holland, Netherlands
- Winkel, (Cranendonck), Netherlands
- Winkel, Switzerland
- Winkel, Illinois, United States

== Other uses ==
- Winkel (surname), including a list of people with the name
- Winkel tripel projection, a map projection

== See also ==
- Winkle (disambiguation)
