= Winkle Island =

Winkle Island may refer to:

- Winkle Island (Hastings), a traffic island in the town of Hastings, England
- Winkle Islands, in Northern Ireland
- Winkle Island (Antarctica)
- Winkle Island, near Warir, West Papua, Indonesia
