= RX12874 =

Military radar detector

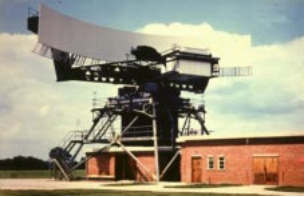
The High Speed Aerial looked for signals across a wide angle.

RX12874, also known as the Passive Detection System (PDS) and by its nickname "Winkle", was a radar detector system used as part of the Royal Air Force's Linesman/Mediator radar network until the early 1980s. Winkle passed out of service along with the rest of the Linesman system as the IUKADGE network replaced it.

Winkle was developed in the late 1950s to counter the carcinotron, a radar jammer so effective that it was initially believed it would render all long-range radars useless. Winkle used a network of stations to listen for carcinotron broadcasts, and combined the information from them to track the jammer aircraft as effectively as a radar could.

The system was based on a series of High Speed Aerial (HSA) installations and AMES Type 85 ("Blue Yeoman") radars. Both were used as receivers; the Type 85 was used primarily to measure the time of arrival of the signal, while the HSA rapidly scanned horizontally to extract a bearing. Information from HSAs and the Type 85s was combined in a correlator that used triangulation and time-of-flight information to determine the location of the jammer-carrying aircraft.

Once the location was determined, it was manually input into the interception controller's displays as if it were a normal radar return, distinguished only by its small circle icon instead of a single dot. Operators could decrease the Type 85 receiver sensitivity while the radar passed that location, so that the jamming did not obscure the display at nearby angles. Combined with identification friend or foe (IFF) signals, this allowed a fighter aircraft's signal to remain visible and interceptions could proceed as normal.

== History ==
=== Carcinotron ===
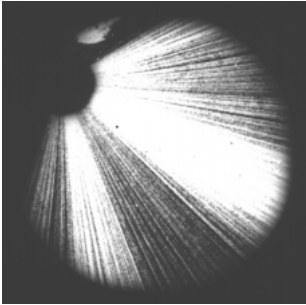
This image shows the effect of four carcinotron-carrying aircraft on a typical 1950s early warning radar. The aircraft are located at the "4 o'clock" and "6 o'clock" positions, which are filled with noise.

In 1950, engineers at the French company CSF (now part of Thales Group) introduced the carcinotron, a microwave-producing vacuum tube that could be tuned across a wide range of frequencies by changing a single input voltage. By continually sweeping through the frequencies of known radars, it would overpower the radar's own reflections, and blind them. Its extremely wide bandwidth meant that a single carcinotron could be used to send jamming signals against any radar it was likely to meet, and the rapid tuning meant it could do so against multiple radars at the same time, or sweep through all potential frequencies to produce barrage jamming.

The carcinotron was revealed publicly in November 1953. The Admiralty Signals and Radar Establishment purchased one and fitted it to a Handley Page Hastings named Catherine, testing it against the latest AMES Type 80 radar late that year. As they feared, it rendered the radar display completely unreadable, filled with noise that hid any real targets. Useful jamming was accomplished even when the aircraft was under the radar horizon, in which case other aircraft had to be 20 miles (32 km) to the sides before they were visible outside the jamming signal. The system was so effective that it appeared to render long-range radar useless.

=== ROTOR ===
The Type 80 was a key part of the ROTOR system, a comprehensive radar and control network covering the entire British Isles. The Catherine tests suggested that the system would be rendered impotent before it was even fully installed. The Royal Aircraft Establishment (RAE) immediately began developing their own carcinotrons for the V Bomber force under the name Indigo Bracket, while solutions to the jamming problem for the RAF's radars were studied.

The first consideration was that the carcinotron provided a relatively weak signal, on the order of 5 kW. When used in barrage mode, this was diluted to perhaps 5 to 10 W per MHz of bandwidth. Due to the radar equation, at long range this was still much stronger than the reflection of the multi-megawatt signal from the radar itself. As the jamming aircraft approached the station, there was some point where the radar began to overpower the jammer, the "self-screening" or "burn-through" point. A very powerful transmitter would increase the range where this occurred. Further improvement could be gained by tightly focusing the beam to put as much power into the reflected signal as possible.

The Royal Radar Establishment (RRE) began the development of such a system with Metropolitan-Vickers (Metrovick) under the name 'Blue Riband'. (Note: It is not clear whether this was an official rainbow code or simply a reference to the prize of the same name. Existing sources are not specific, but "riband" is not normally part of these codes.) It was assumed that a jammer could produce as much as 10 W per MHz across the entire S-band. Through the use of twelve 4.5 MW klystron transmitters broadcast through an enormous 75 by 50 foot (23 by 15 m) antenna system, the Blue Riband produced 11.4 W per MHz of reflected signal at 200 miles (320 km), thereby overpowering the assumed threat. To force the jammer to spread out its signal across a wide band, the radar randomly changed frequencies with every pulse, across a 500 MHz bandwidth.

=== Changing strategies ===
Throughout this period, there has been an ongoing debate about the usefulness of air defences. The introduction of the hydrogen bomb meant a single aircraft could destroy any target, and the higher speeds and altitudes of bomber aircraft meant the bombs could be dropped from further away. By 1954, the Chief of the Air Staff had concluded that close defence was useless, and began plans to remove anti-aircraft artillery from the defence. By December, planners believed the only practical role for air defence was to protect the V-force while it was launching. In keeping with this role, over the next few years the number of radar stations and fighters continued to be reduced as the protected area contracted around the Midlands.

The 1957 Defence White Paper shifted priorities from manned bombers to missiles. The only way to defend against a missile attack was deterrence, so it was absolutely vital that the V-force survive. This meant that any attack, whether by aircraft or missiles, would require the V-force to launch immediately; the interceptor defence could not guarantee their survival even in the case of an all-bomber attack, and could do nothing at all in the case of missiles. By the end of 1957, the idea of any defence of the deterrent force had been abandoned; a bomber attack simply implied missiles were following. Now the bombers would launch to staging areas after receiving any credible threat. The need for the long-distance coverage of Blue Riband disappeared.

One new role did emerge. Since the attack would likely come from missiles, the Soviets might attempt to jam the Ballistic Missile Early Warning System (BMEWS) radars by flying aircraft far offshore and using a carcinotron against the relatively narrow band of the BMEWS. They might mask a bomber attack on the V-force bases the same way by jamming the ROTOR radars. Such jamming would require the launch of the V-force while the nature of the threat was determined, and repeated spoofing of this sort could quickly wear out the aircraft and their crews. A system for detecting such an attack and countering it was considered valuable.

This role would not require the massive Blue Riband and led to the "Blue Yeoman" concept, combining the electronics of the Blue Riband with a smaller 45 by 21.5 foot (13.7 by 6.6 m) antenna originally developed as an upgrade for the Orange Yeoman radar. (Note: The name "Blue Yeoman" appears to be a combination of Blue Riband and Orange Yeoman, and not selected randomly as was typical for the Rainbow Codes.) Associated Electrical Industries took up production of this system as the AMES Type 85. As these still had long range, only nine were needed to cover most of the UK. Over time these plans were repeatedly scaled back, eventually producing a system known as Linesman with three stations covering only the southern portions of England, protecting Bomber Command's bases and the BMEWS radar.

=== Correlation radar ===
In 1947, the Royal Aircraft Establishment (RAE) was handed the task of developing guided missiles, taking over from a previously diverse group of efforts. Several engineers from the RRDE were sent to the RAE at Farnborough Airport to aid the design of the tracking and guidance systems. Among the group was George Clarke, who had worked on the LOPGAP missile guidance system but was more interested in advanced radar development.

In 1949 Clarke invented a novel sort of identification friend or foe (IFF) system that did not have to be triggered by a pulse sent from the ground. Instead, each airborne IFF would broadcast signals at random times. This avoided a problem seen in densely trafficked areas where the interrogation pulse from the ground IFF transceiver would generate so many transponder replies that they would overlap in time and interfere with each other. In Clarke's system the transponders naturally sent out replies spread out in time, making it much less likely they would overlap.

In a traditional IFF, the time between sending the interrogation pulse and its reception allowed the range to the transponder to be determined. In Clarke's system, the receiver did not know when the signal was sent, and could no longer use this method. Instead, the signal would be received by three antennas, and using a device known as a "correlator", better known today as a matched filter, pulses from a single IFF broadcast could be picked out of the many possible returns. By delaying the signals until they lined up in time, the difference in time that it took the signal to reach each of the antennas was extracted. The difference between any two antennas results in a continuum of possible locations along a hyperbola. By making similar measurements between all the stations, A-B, B-C and C-A, three such hyperbolas are constructed, which theoretically intersect at a single point, but more typically form a small triangle due to inherent inaccuracies. The idea was not picked up for development.

Later that year, Clarke proposed a new missile tracking and guidance system based on the same basic technique. Due to short flight times, a missile tracking system would want to detect the target as rapidly as possible, but as radars of the era were mechanically rotated, there was a limit to their scanning rate. Clarke proposed using a single large "floodlight" transmitter and three receivers placed at the corners of a 15 miles (24 km) baseline triangle. The signal reflecting off of any object in the area would be converted into a location in the same way as the IFF system. All of the targets within the floodlit space could be located simultaneously and continually. A review of the concept suggested there were too many unknown factors to begin serious development, and Clarke was moved to a group working on radar countermeasures.

=== Winkle ===
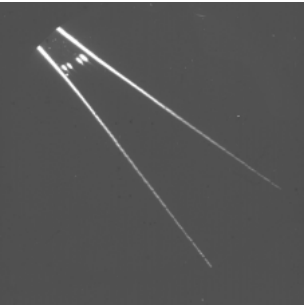
This image shows the same four jammer aircraft as in the image above, but now correlated by the Winkle system. The individual aircraft are clearly visible.

In 1951, Clarke proposed a yet another system based on the same principles, this time as a way to track aircraft carrying jammers. The RAE considered the concept and suggested there were three possible ways it could be used; the first was the three-station concept of Clarke's missile proposal, the second used angular measurements from two widely spaced antennas for simple triangulation, the third used two antennas to find one hyperbola using Clarke's method, and an angular measurement from one of the two stations to intersect with it.

While the two-angle solution might appear to be the simplest, it suffers from a problem when there is more than one jammer in an area. Against a single jammer, the receivers both receive the signal and measure its angle relative to their station. When these angles are plotted on a map, they intersect at a single location. If there are two jammer aircraft in the area, both stations will produce two angle measurements, one for each aircraft. When these are plotted on the shared map there will be four intersections; two of these hold aircraft, the other two are "ghosts". A third aircraft increases this to nine points and six ghosts, and so on. The RAF desired a system able to deal with mass raids, so this solution was not appropriate.

Correlators avoid this problem because they are extremely sensitive to the details of the signal pulses, to the point where pulses received from two different aircraft will not produce an output signal. Only when the correlator is fed the signals from the same jammer will a result be returned, thereby removing the ambiguity. Using correlation systems as the only measurement system would work, as Clarke originally proposed, but this would require two or three of correlators, which were very expensive. Thus, the concept using one angle measurement and one correlation was selected as the best compromise.

Norman Bailey of the Telecommunications Research Establishment (Note: The TRE became the Royal Radar Establishment in 1954.) wrote a paper on the topic, which demonstrated the concept was feasible. In 1954, Marconi was given a contract with the RAE to produce an experimental system under the code-name "Winkle". (Note: Why this project was not assigned a Rainbow Code is not mentioned in available sources.) Most of the development work was carried out at the Marconi Research Centre in Great Baddow.

They designed a system that used an antenna with a relatively wide acceptance angle, around 70 degrees horizontally, that was used while measuring the correlation. When a correlation was detected, an electronic scanning system would rapidly measure the angle with an accuracy of about one degree. In order for the correlation to work, the signal from the two widely separated antennas had to be combined in the correlator. This was accomplished using a microwave relay between the stations. An experimental version was constructed between Great Baddow and the Royal Radar Establishment's South Site in Great Malvern, about 100 miles (160 km) apart.

A second system with prototype receivers was built in 1956 between RAF Bard Hill in Norfolk and RAF Bempton in Yorkshire. Initial tests were carried out with a jammer placed on a tower between the two stations, and this was used to further develop the correlator system. They eventually moved to aircraft tests. In one test, four aircraft, all carrying jammers, were correctly plotted.

When Blue Riband was cancelled in early 1958, and the new threat of BMEWS-jamming was identified, the concept saw renewed interest. A design study for a system as part of the new radar deployment known as Plan Ahead, which later became Linesman, began in late 1958, followed by a development contract in August 1959.

=== Deployment ===
The basic concept required the correlator to be fed the same signal from the two antennas. This presented a problem; the correlator took a short time to perform its work, longer than the ideal scanning rate during the angle measurement. This could be solved with separate correlators at every measured angle, but the cost would be prohibitive. A new system was designed that used a small number of correlators and a computer as a memory system that allowed the detection of potential correlations to take place over the period of the scan. The correlators would make their measurement, store their results in the computer, and then be available for a measurement at another angle.

Development went smoothly, and production started in 1962 even while development was ongoing. The first High Speed Aerial was built at Marconi's factory in Bushy Hill and connected to the prototype Blue Yeoman at the RRE in Great Malvern. The system was demonstrated to a NATO delegation in May 1964. The first production site at RAF Neatishead was planned to start testing in October 1965, and the two following stations at RAF Staxton Wold and RAF Boulmer were completed ahead of schedule in early 1966.

The first baseline using these three stations began testing in March 1966. After considerable testing and some minor corrections, the Staxton Wold site passed its acceptance trials in May/June 1968, and was handed to the RAF in October. Boulmer and Dundonald followed in November, and Neatishead in December.

=== Replacement ===
Although the development of the PDS went fairly smoothly, the same was not true of the rest of the Linesman system. The Type 85 radars were repeatedly delayed and did not begin operation until 1968. (Note: Which is why the PDS network was not declared operational until that time.) The central control station in the London area was not fully functional until November 1973. By that time any plans to expand Linesman had been abandoned.

The central site, known as L1, was not hardened. When Linesman was designed in the late 1950s, it was assumed that any war would quickly turn nuclear, and if H-bombs were going off there was no point in trying to prevent L1's destruction. However, as the USSR began to reach strategic parity with NATO in the late 1960s, this thinking changed. Now the idea of nuclear exchanges early in the war was no longer credible. It appeared that a lengthy conventional war would precede any nuclear one, or never become nuclear.

In this setting, the Soviets could bomb the shore-side radars or even L1 with conventional weapons without fear of sparking a nuclear war. They would then have unfettered access to the UK's airspace. Since the Linesman system was designed primarily for early warning and anti-jamming during a short all-out nuclear war, it did not have the capability needed to deal with follow-up attacks. This shift in perceived threat implied the Linesman system was extremely vulnerable. Worse, the carcinotron might be used against the microwave links between the stations, rendering the system useless. Even before it reached its Phase 1 availability, it was decided to abandon further improvements to the system and use those funds to design and purchase its replacement as soon as possible.

Marconi had already been developing new radar systems using a unique receiver design and responded to this need by introducing the Marconi Martello series of passive electronically scanned array (PESA) radars. For a variety of reasons, these were far less susceptible to jamming than radars that had to scan mechanically, and for most uses, these rendered the carcinotron much less effective. Martello's entered service with the RAF as the AMES Type 90 and Type 91 as part of a nationwide system known as Improved UKADGE, replacing the entire Linesman system by 1984.

== Description ==
The High Speed Aerial (HSA) was designed to have partial vertical focussing to allow it to scan to high elevation angles. During normal reception, a series of feed horns allowed signals from anywhere across the front of the antenna to be received in a pattern that was about 70 degrees wide.

This lack of focusing was deliberate, as it meant the two antennas on a baseline did not have to be pointing at the same target at the same time, something that would only be possible if the rough location was already known. Instead, the antennas simply had to be pointing in the same general point on the compass rose, and if a target was anywhere in front of either, their signals would line up in the correlator.

As the antenna had a wide acceptance area and its own scanning system, it did not necessarily have to rotate. In some modes, it could be set to one of four fixed angles arranged to cover either side of the baseline between the HSA and its associated Type 85. There were two settings on either side, "near look" and "far look". Alternately, the HSA could rotate in synchronicity with the Type 85 antenna, normally performing a complete 360 degree scan at 4 RPM, or alternately a sector scan at the same angular speed of 24 degrees per second. This meant the radar and PDS both had the same "data rate".

During normal operations, the associated Type 85 was continually scanning. When the Type 85 scanned past a jammer, the jammer signal would briefly reach the correlator. As long as the HSA was pointed in the same general direction it would send the same signal to the correlator, and the correlator would output a "match". When a match was seen, the HSA would then use its organ-pipe scanner to rapidly scan horizontally. The narrow beam of the Type 85 painted any single target for only about 1/50 of a second, and the HSA scanned the entire 70 degree space in front of it during that period. This is the origin of the name "high speed".

During the scan, the jammer signal would still be visible to the Type 85, and would also appear in two or three of the feed horns on the HSA. These signals were fed into a bank of correlators. The correlation takes some time, so multiple correlators were needed in order to perform the comparisons in parallel for several of the feed horns at the same time. This was the purpose of storing the outputs in a computer; instead of a correlator for every feed horn, the system used a smaller number arranged in a loop, and as soon as one correlation was complete, its measurement was stored in the computer and then it was used to perform the correlation on the next feed horn.

When the scan was complete, this data was sent to a unique "theta-phi" display. The display was drawn by scanning vertically, as opposed to horizontally as in conventional analogue television. (Note: Easily arranged simply by rotating a conventional television screen in its chassis.) Each vertical scan displayed the correlator value measured through one of the feed horns, and then it moved slightly to the right to repeat this for the next feed horn value. The result was an X-Y display with the X coordinate being the angle and the Y coordinate the range.

Since the signal would likely be visible in several of the feed horns, as their reception patterns overlapped slightly in the horizontal axis, the target did not appear as a single dot but a "constellation" of closely spaced dots. The operator could control the gain to make the weaker spots disappear, and then estimate the location of the aircraft in the remaining set. They would then use a normal voice telephone link to an operator at the L1 station, who would manually enter the location into the main displays. To aid the conversion from X-Y to a map location, the display added additional vertical lines to divide the display into "sectors" which could then be looked up on a map.

Due to the "stacked" vertical beams of the Type 85, height finding was still possible by examining which beams were receiving the jamming signal and which were clear of it.
