= Van Winkle =

Van Winkle is a Dutch surname. It is the Anglicization of Van Winkel, meaning "from shop" in modern Dutch, but originating as "from Winkel", a number of places in the Low Countries and Germany. Perhaps the most famous Van Winkle is the title character of "Rip Van Winkle", an 1819 short story by Washington Irving.

People with the surname include:

- Archie Van Winkle (1925–1986), U.S. Marine awarded the Medal of Honor
- Barrik Van Winkle, American linguistic and legal anthropologist
- Isaac Homer Van Winkle (1870–1943), American attorney and Attorney General of Oregon
- Marshall Van Winkle (1869–1957), U.S. Representative and grandnephew of Peter G. Van Winkle
- Mina Van Winkle (1875–1933), American crusading social worker, suffragist and groundbreaking police lieutenant
- Peter G. Van Winkle (1808–1872), U.S. Senator
- Robert E. Lee Van Winkle (1862–1928), Mayor of Oklahoma City
- Vanilla Ice (born Robert Van Winkle in 1967), American rapper
- Ryan Van Winkle (born 1977), American poet
- Travis Van Winkle (born 1982), American actor
- Winant Van Winkle (1879–1943), New Jersey state senator

== See also ==
- Pappy Van Winkle's Family Reserve, a brand of whisky
