= RAF Oxenhope Moor =

Former Royal Air Force base in Yorkshire, England

- Yorkshire, England
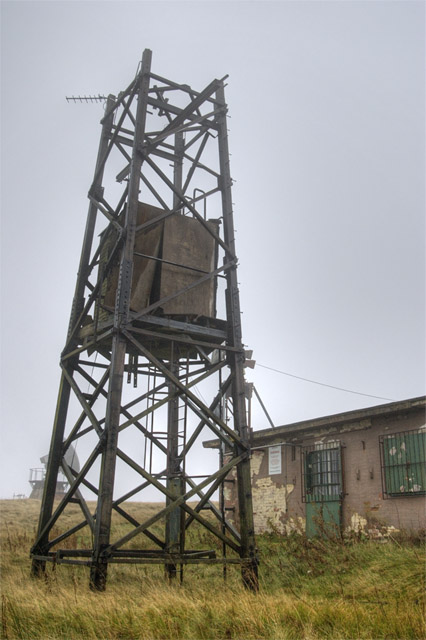
- The remains of a communications mast at RAF Oxenhope.

Site information
- Controlled by: Royal Air Force
- Condition: demolished

Location
- Coordinates: 53.7913°N 1.984°W

Site history
- In use: 1942–1970

RAF Oxenhope Moor was a British Second World War radio station, located on Cock Hill Moor near the village of Oxenhope in Yorkshire. It was known by a number of different names, including Oxenhope Laboratory, Oxenhope Radar Station and Oxenhope Weather Station.

The station was built during the Second World War and was used as part of the GEE navigation system (started in March 1942) used to guide bombers to their targets in Europe. The station was maintained by the RAF as No. 585 Signals Unit until 1970, and was then taken over by the University of Bradford.
