= Nate Winkel =

American soccer player

Personal information
- Full name: Nathaniel Winkel
- Date of birth: June 30, 1978 (age 48)
- Place of birth: Richfield, MN, United States
- Height: 5 ft 10 in (1.78 m)
- Position: Midfielder

Youth career
- 1996–1997: Maine Black Bears
- 1998–1999: Marquette Golden Eagles
- 1999: Twin Cities Tornado

Senior career*
Years	Team	Apps	(Gls)
2000–2001	Minnesota Thunder	26	(3)
2002	Carolina Dynamo	10	(0)
2003	Höllvikens GIF	-	(-)
2004	Virginia Beach Mariners	24	(1)
2005	Högaborgs BK	-	(-)
2006	Minnesota Thunder	13	(0)
2010	Western Suburbs FC	1	(-)
- * Club domestic league appearances and goals

Nathaniel "Nate" Winkel (born June 30, 1978) is an American soccer midfielder who played professionally in the United States, Sweden and New Zealand.

Winkel came out of retirement in 2019 to join North Tam United in the Marin Over 40s League and made an immediate impact with his composure on the ball, efficient distribution, strong controlling presence in central midfield and perceptive half-time coaching.

Winkel's strong first season was capped off by being awarded the prestigious North Tam Player of the Season trophy for Summer 2019, as voted on by his teammates.

== Youth ==
Winkel was born in Richfield, Minnesota, where he was a 1995 and 1996 All State High School soccer player; he graduated in 1996. He began his college career at the University of Maine in 1996 and 1997. He transferred to Marquette University for the 1998 and 1999 seasons. During the 1999 off-season, Winkel played for the Twin Cities Tornado of the USL Premier Development League.

== Professional ==
In February 2000, the Minnesota Thunder selected Winkel in the first round of the USL A-League draft. In 2002, he moved to the Carolina Dynamo. He had spells in Sweden with Höllvikens GIF and Högaborgs BK. In 2004, he played for the Virginia Beach Mariners. In 2006, he rejoined the Thunder and played 13 matches for the team in the 2006 season. In 2010, Winkel played one game for Western Suburbs FC in New Zealand, but retired because of injuries. He is the executive director of the Ole Soccer Academy in Wellington.
