= Winkle Brig =

Type of brig

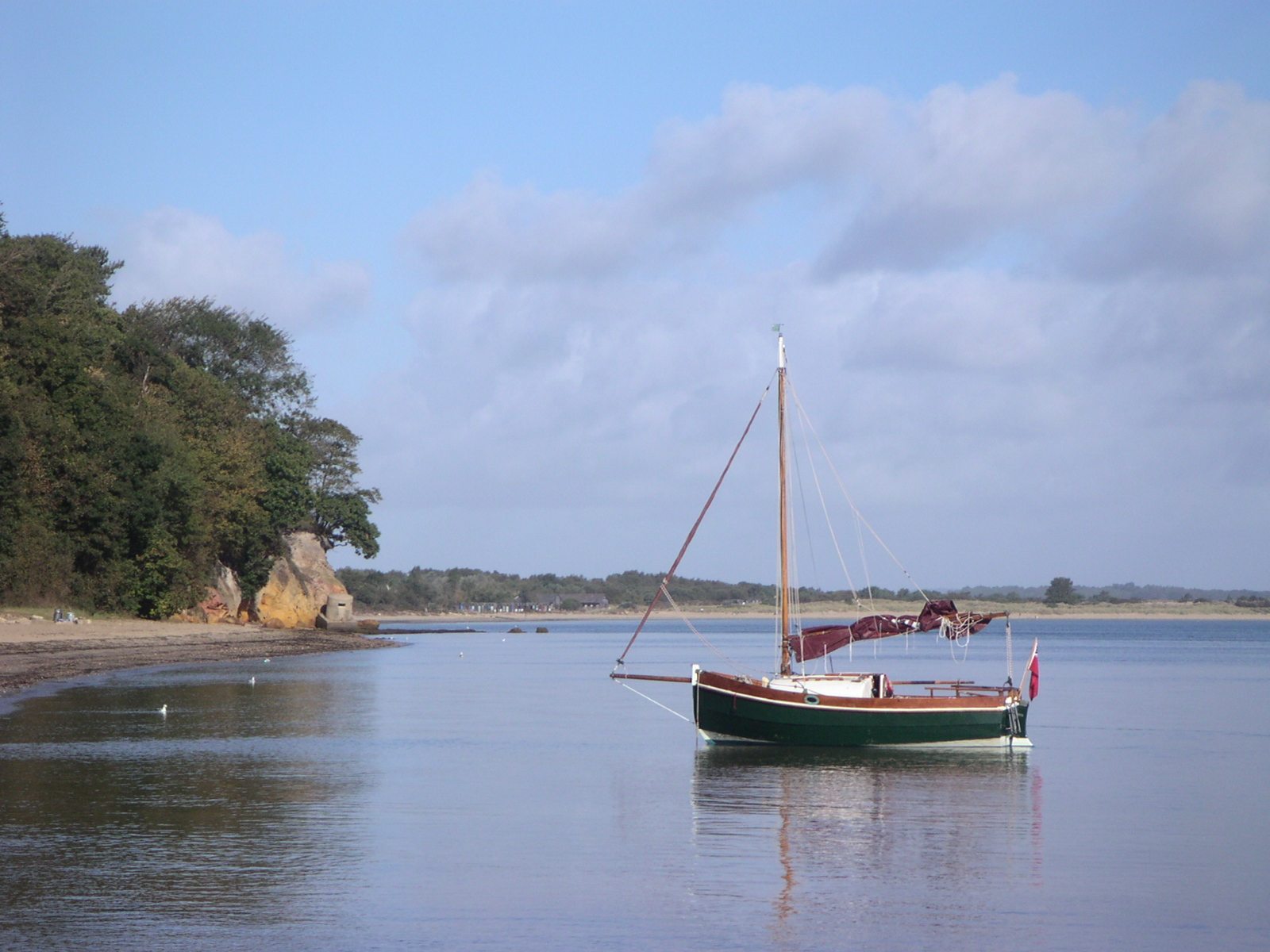
- A Winkle Brig at anchor

Development
- Designer: Eric Bergqvist
- Name: Winkle Brig

Boat
- Crew: 2
- Draft: 1 ft 2 in (0.36 m); 2 ft 6 in (0.76 m)

Hull
- Type: Monohull
- Construction: GRP
- LOA: 20 ft (6.1 m)
- LOH: 16 ft (4.9 m)
- LWL: 15 ft (4.6 m)
- Beam: 6 ft 4 in (1.93 m)

Rig
- Rig type: Gaff rig

Sails
- Mainsail area: 104 sq ft (9.7 m^{2})
- Jib/genoa area: 42 sq ft (3.9 m^{2})
- Total sail area: 172 sq ft (16.0 m^{2})

The Winkle Brig is a 16 ft (4.9 m) gaff rig pocket cruiser built between 1985 and 2002. Approximately 122 were built before production ceased.

Designer: Eric Bergqvist

Builders: Ferry Boatyard, Cheshire, England

- Length on deck: 16 ft (4.9 m)
- Length overall: 20 ft (6.1 m)
- Waterline length: 15 ft (4.6 m)
- Beam: 6 ft 8 in (2.03 m)
- Draught: 1 ft 2in / 2 ft 6in (twin retractable bilge boards)
- Displacement: 650 kg

Sails:

- Main 104 sq ft (9.7 m^{2})
- Jib 42 sq ft (3.9 m^{2})
- Topsail 26 sq ft (2.4 m^{2})

== See also ==
- Gaff rig
