= Barrage jamming =

Electronic warfare technique

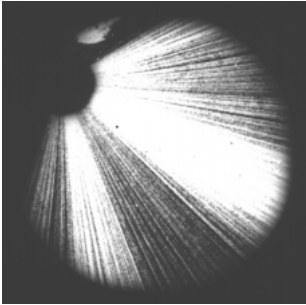
This image shows the effect of four carcinotron-carrying aircraft on a typical 1950s early warning radar. The aircraft are located at the 4 and 6 o'clock positions, which are completely filled with noise.

Barrage jamming is an electronic warfare technique that attempts to blind ("jam") radar systems by filling the display with noise, rendering the broadcaster's blip invisible on the display, and often those in the nearby area as well. "Barrage" refers to systems that send signals in many bands of frequencies compared to the bandwidth of any single radar. This allows the jammer to jam multiple radars at once, and reduces or eliminates the need for adjustments to respond to any single radar.

Early radar systems typically operated on a single frequency, and could only change that frequency by changing internal electronics. Against these radars, it was possible to use conventional radio sets to send out signals on the same band, causing the radar display to be filled with noise whenever the antenna was pointed in the general direction of the jammer. However, given that each individual radar would be operating on different frequencies, this "spot jamming" technique required multiple radio sets in order to jam more than one radar at a time, and true wide-band barrage jamming was very difficult.

Early barrage jammers in World War II used photomultiplier tubes to amplify a wideband noise source, An improved approach appeared with the introduction of the carcinotron in the early 1950s, a vacuum tube that generates microwaves whose frequency can be adjusted across a very wide band simply by changing the input voltage. A single carcinotron could be swept through the entire bandwidth of any potential radar network, jamming all of the radars in such rapid sequence that it appeared to be constant noise on all frequencies at all times. A downside to this approach is that the signal only spends a brief period of time at any one radar's frequency; depending on the scanning rate, the radar may only be jammed during certain periods, but if the rate is increased to offset this, the amount of noise in any one pulse period is reduced. More complex jammers can scan only the bands it sees being used, improving its effectiveness.

Barrage jamming was extremely effective against 1950s radars, to the point where there was some belief that the carcinotron might render ground-based radars useless, especially in the early warning radar role. By the 1960s a number of techniques had been introduced to combat barrage jamming. Frequency agile radars, which change their frequency from pulse to pulse, force the jammer spread its signal across the entire bandwidth, ensuring the signal is diluted. Combining this with extremely powerful signals and highly focused antennas allowed new radars to overpower the jammers, "burning through" the jamming. Simple techniques, like turning off the receivers when the antenna was pointed close to the jammer, allowed the radar to continue tracking other targets. The use of phased array antennas and signal processing techniques that reduced sidelobes also improved performance.

Barrage jammers also have the disadvantage that they are very easy to detect using a wideband receiver. This can be used to track the jammer using a variety of techniques. A well developed instance of this was deployed by the RAF in their RX12874 network, which could track jammer-carrying aircraft with accuracy equal to a radar. More generally, a barrage jammer's signal is so easy to receive that it makes an excellent early warning signal on its own.

== See also ==
- Radio jamming
