= Winkle Islands =

- County: County Antrim
- Country: Northern Ireland
- Sovereign state: United Kingdom
- Police: Northern Ireland
- Fire: Northern Ireland
- Ambulance: Northern Ireland

Winkle Islands (or Winkle Isle) are part of the Skerries, islands close to Portrush, County Antrim, Northern Ireland.

Winkle Isle is the local name for the large Skerry island, the small Skerry being known as Castle Isle.

It is not a townland in its own right as some sources seem to indicate.
