= Defence Research Policy Committee =

The Defence Research Policy Committee, or DRPC, was a British Cabinet-level standing committee formed in 1947 that advised and directed military research in the United Kingdom. It was the equivalent of the US's National Defense Research Committee or the Canadian Defence Research Board. Among its better known chairmen were Henry Tizard, John Cockcroft and Solly Zuckerman. Its advice was "typically ignored" and the committee was reformed in 1963.
