= Backward-wave oscillator =

Vacuum tube used to generate microwaves

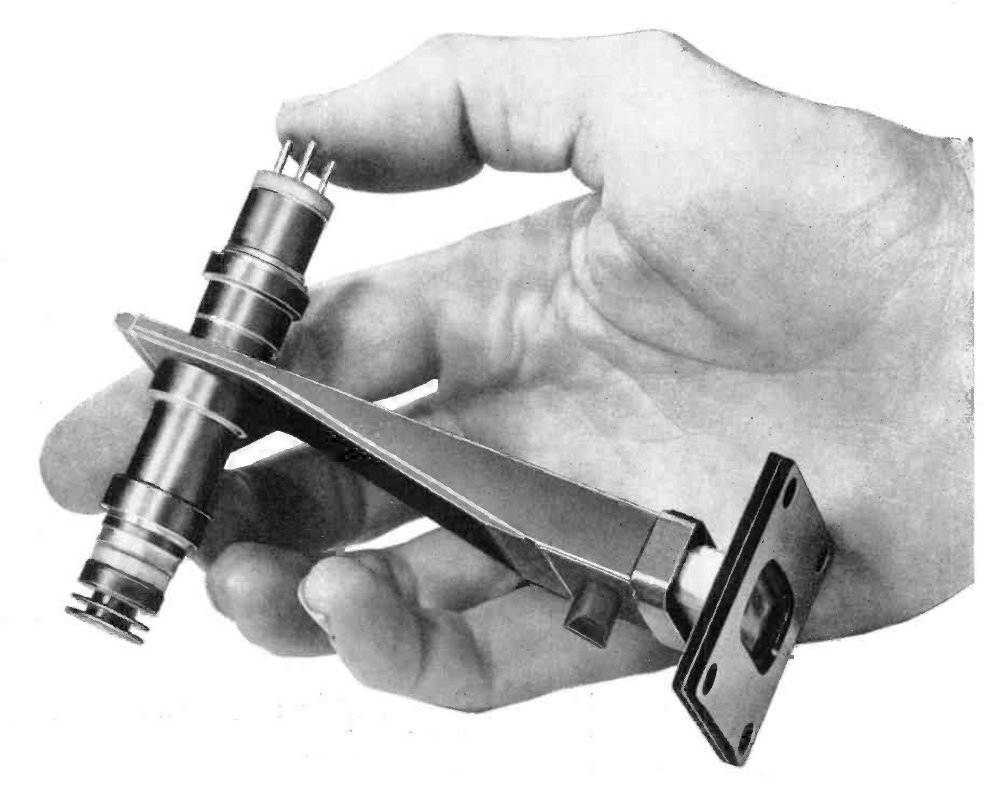
Miniature O-type backward-wave oscillator tube produced by Varian in 1956. It could be voltage-tuned over an 8.2 - 12.4 GHz range and required a supply voltage of 600 V.

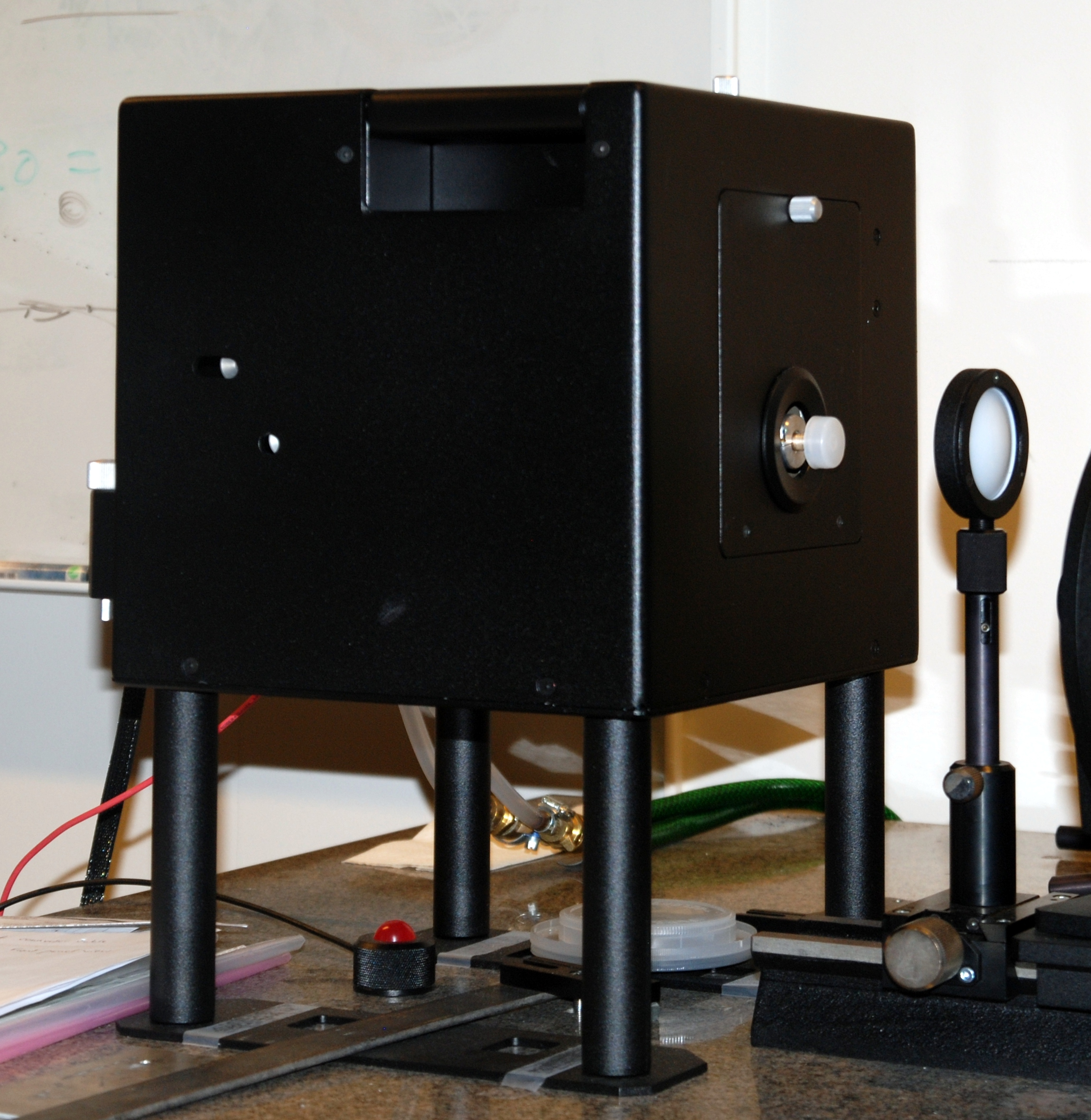
Backward wave oscillator at Stockholm University operating in the terahertz range

A backward wave oscillator (BWO), also called carcinotron or backward wave tube, is a vacuum tube that is used to generate microwaves up to the terahertz range. Belonging to the traveling-wave tube family, it is an oscillator with a wide electronic tuning range.

An electron gun generates an electron beam that interacts with a slow-wave structure. It sustains the oscillations by propagating a traveling wave backwards against the beam. The generated electromagnetic wave power has its group velocity directed oppositely to the direction of motion of the electrons. The output power is coupled out near the electron gun.

It has two main subtypes, the M-type (M-BWO), the most powerful, and the O-type (O-BWO). The output power of the O-type is typically in the range of 1 mW at 1000 GHz to 50 mW at 200 GHz. Carcinotrons are used as powerful and stable microwave sources. Due to the good quality wavefront they produce (see below), they find use as illuminators in terahertz imaging.

The backward wave oscillators were demonstrated in 1951, M-type by Bernard Epsztein and O-type by Rudolf Kompfner. The M-type BWO is a voltage-controlled non-resonant extrapolation of magnetron interaction. Both types are tunable over a wide range of frequencies by varying the accelerating voltage. They can be swept through the band fast enough to be appearing to radiate over all the band at once, which makes them suitable for effective radar jamming, quickly tuning into the radar frequency. Carcinotrons allowed airborne radar jammers to be highly effective. However, frequency-agile radars can hop frequencies fast enough to force the jammer to use barrage jamming, diluting its output power over a wide band and significantly impairing its efficiency.

Carcinotrons are used in research, civilian and military applications. For example, the Czechoslovak Kopac passive sensor and Ramona passive sensor air defense detection systems employed carcinotrons in their receiver systems.

== Basic concept ==
All travelling-wave tubes operate in the same general fashion, and differ primarily in details of their construction. The concept is dependent on a steady stream of electrons from an electron gun that travel down the center of the tube (see adjacent concept diagram). Surrounding the electron beam is some sort of radio frequency source signal; in the case of the traditional klystron this is a resonant cavity fed with an external signal, whereas in more modern devices there are a series of these cavities or a helical metal wire fed with the same signal.

As the electrons travel down the tube, they interact with the RF signal. The electrons are attracted to areas with maximum positive bias and repelled from negative areas. This causes the electrons to bunch up as they are repelled or attracted along the length of the tube, a process known as velocity modulation. This process makes the electron beam take on the same general structure as the original signal; the density of the electrons in the beam matches the relative amplitude of the RF signal in the induction system. The electron current is a function of the details of the gun, and is generally orders of magnitude more powerful than the input RF signal. The result is a signal in the electron beam that is an amplified version of the original RF signal.

As the electrons are moving, they induce a magnetic field in any nearby conductor. This allows the now-amplified signal to be extracted. In systems like the magnetron or klystron, this is accomplished with another resonant cavity. In the helical designs, this process occurs along the entire length of the tube, reinforcing the original signal in the helical conductor. The "problem" with traditional designs is that they have relatively narrow bandwidths; designs based on resonators will work with signals within 10% or 20% of their design, as this is physically built into the resonator design, while the helix designs have a much wider bandwidth, perhaps 100% on either side of the design peak.

== BWO ==
Concept diagram. The signals travel from the input to the output as described in text within the image.

The BWO is built in a fashion similar to the helical TWT. However, instead of the RF signal propagating in the same (or similar) direction as the electron beam, the original signal travels at right angles to the beam. This is normally accomplished by drilling a hole through a rectangular waveguide and shooting the beam through the hole. The waveguide then goes through two right angle turns, forming a C-shape and crossing the beam again. This basic pattern is repeated along the length of the tube so the waveguide passes across the beam several times, forming a series of S-shapes.

The original RF signal enters from what would be the far end of the TWT, where the energy would be extracted. The effect of the signal on the passing beam causes the same velocity modulation effect, but because of the direction of the RF signal and specifics of the waveguide, this modulation travels backward along the beam, instead of forward. This propagation, the slow-wave, reaches the next hole in the folded waveguide just as the same phase of the RF signal does. This causes amplification just like the traditional TWT.

In a traditional TWT, the speed of propagation of the signal in the induction system has to be similar to that of the electrons in the beam. This is required so that the phase of the signal lines up with the bunched electrons as they pass the inductors. This places limits on the selection of wavelengths the device can amplify, based on the physical construction of the wires or resonant chambers.

This is not the case in the BWO, where the electrons pass the signal at right angles and their speed of propagation is independent of that of the input signal. The complex serpentine waveguide places strict limits on the bandwidth of the input signal, such that a standing wave is formed within the guide. But the velocity of the electrons is limited only by the allowable voltages applied to the electron gun, which can be easily and rapidly changed. Thus the BWO takes a single input frequency and produces a wide range of output frequencies.

== Carcinotron ==
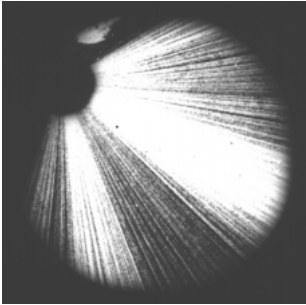
This image shows the effect of four carcinotron-carrying aircraft on a typical 1950s pulse radar. The aircraft are located at roughly the 10:00 and 11:30 locations. The display is filled with noise any time the antenna's main lobe or sidelobes pass the jammer, rendering the aircraft invisible.

The device was originally given the name "carcinotron", after the Greek name for the crayfish, which swim backwards. By simply changing the supply voltage, the device could produce any required frequency across a band that was much larger than any existing microwave amplifier could match - the cavity magnetron worked at a single frequency defined by the physical dimensions of their resonators, and while the klystron amplified an external signal, it only did so efficiently within a small range of frequencies.

Previously, jamming a radar was a complex and time-consuming operation. Operators had to listen for potential frequencies being used, set up one of a bank of amplifiers on that frequency, and then begin broadcasting. When the radar station realized what was happening, they would change their frequencies and the process would begin again. In contrast, the carcinotron could sweep through all the possible frequencies so rapidly that it appeared to be a constant signal on all of the frequencies at once. Typical designs could generate hundreds or low thousands of watts, so at any one frequency, there might be a few watts of power that is received by the radar station. However, at long range the amount of energy from the original radar broadcast that reaches the aircraft is only a few watts at most, so the carcinotron can overpower them.

The system was so powerful that it was found that a carcinotron operating on an aircraft would begin to be effective even before it rose above the radar horizon. As it swept through the frequencies it would broadcast on the radar's operating frequency at what were effectively random times, filling the display with random dots any time the antenna was pointed near it, perhaps 3 degrees on either side of the target. There were so many dots that the display simply filled with white noise in that area. As it approached the station, the signal would also begin to appear in the antenna's sidelobes, creating further areas that were blanked out by noise. At close range, on the order of 100 miles (160 km), the entire radar display would be completely filled with noise, rendering it useless.

The concept was so powerful as a jammer that there were serious concerns that ground-based radars were obsolete. Airborne radars had the advantage that they could approach the aircraft carrying the jammer, and, eventually, the huge output from their transmitter would "burn through" the jamming. However, interceptors of the era relied on ground direction to get into range, using ground-based radars. This represented an enormous threat to air defense operations.

For ground radars, the threat was eventually solved in two ways. The first was that radars were upgraded to operate on many different frequencies and switch among them randomly from pulse to pulse, a concept now known as frequency agility. Some of these frequencies were never used in peacetime, and highly secret, with the hope that they would not be known to the jammer in wartime. The carcinotron could still sweep through the entire band, but then it would be broadcasting on the same frequency as the radar only at random times, reducing its effectiveness. The other solution was to add passive receivers that triangulated on the carcinotron broadcasts, allowing the ground stations to produce accurate tracking information on the location of the jammer and allowing them to be attacked.

== The slow-wave structure ==
(a) Forward fundamental space harmonic (n=0), (b) Backward fundamental

The needed slow-wave structures must support a radio frequency (RF) electric field with a longitudinal component; the structures are periodic in the direction of the beam and behave like microwave filters with passbands and stopbands. Due to the periodicity of the geometry, the fields are identical from cell to cell except for a constant phase shift Φ. This phase shift, a purely real number in a passband of a lossless structure, varies with frequency. According to Floquet's theorem (see Floquet theory), the RF electric field E(z,t) can be described at an angular frequency ω, by a sum of an infinity of "spatial or space harmonics" E_{n}

$$E(z,t) =\sum_{n=-\infty}^{+\infty} {E_n}e^{j({\omega}t-{k_n}z)}$$

where the wave number or propagation constant k_{n} of each harmonic is expressed as

k_{n} = (Φ + 2nπ) / p (-π < Φ < +π)

z being the direction of propagation, p the pitch of the circuit and n an integer.

Two examples of slow-wave circuit characteristics are shown, in the ω-k or Brillouin diagram:

- on figure (a), the fundamental n=0 is a forward space harmonic (the phase velocity v_{n}=ω/k_{n} has the same sign as the group velocity v_{g}=dω/dk_{n}), synchronism condition for backward interaction is at point B, intersection of the line of slope v_{e} - the beam velocity - with the first backward (n = -1) space harmonic,
- on figure (b) the fundamental (n=0) is backward

A periodic structure can support both forward and backward space harmonics, which are not modes of the field, and cannot exist independently, even if a beam can be coupled to only one of them.

As the magnitude of the space harmonics decreases rapidly when the value of n is large, the interaction can be significant only with the fundamental or the first space harmonic.

== M-type BWO ==
Schematic of an M-BWO

The M-type carcinotron, or M-type backward wave oscillator, uses crossed static electric field E and magnetic field B, similar to the magnetron, for focussing an electron sheet beam drifting perpendicularly to E and B, along a slow-wave circuit, with a velocity E/B. Strong interaction occurs when the phase velocity of one space harmonic of the wave is equal to the electron velocity. Both E_{z} and E_{y} components of the RF field are involved in the interaction (E_{y} parallel to the static E field). Electrons which are in a decelerating E_{z} electric field of the slow-wave, lose the potential energy they have in the static electric field E and reach the circuit. The sole electrode is more negative than the cathode, in order to avoid collecting those electrons having gained energy while interacting with the slow-wave space harmonic.

== O-type BWO ==
The O-type carcinotron, or O-type backward wave oscillator, uses an electron beam longitudinally focused by a magnetic field, and a slow-wave circuit interacting with the beam. A collector collects the beam at the end of the tube.

=== O-BWO spectral purity and noise ===
The BWO is a voltage tunable oscillator, whose voltage tuning rate is directly related to the propagation characteristics of the circuit. The oscillation starts at a frequency where the wave propagating on the circuit is synchronous with the slow space charge wave of the beam. Inherently the BWO is more sensitive than other oscillators to external fluctuations. Nevertheless, its ability to be phase- or frequency-locked has been demonstrated, leading to successful operation as a heterodyne local oscillator.

==== Frequency stability ====
The frequency–voltage sensitivity, is given by the relation

$\Delta$f/f = 1/2 [1/(1 + |v_{Φ}/v_{g}|)] ($\Delta$V_{0}/V_{0})

The oscillation frequency is also sensitive to the beam current (called "frequency pushing"). The current fluctuations at low frequencies are mainly due to the anode voltage supply, and the sensitivity to the anode voltage is given by

$\Delta$f/f = 3/4 [ω_{q}/ω/(1 + |v_{Φ}/v_{g}|)] ($\Delta$V_{a}/V_{a})

This sensitivity as compared to the cathode voltage sensitivity, is reduced by the ratio ω_{q}/ω, where ω_{q} is the angular plasma frequency; this ratio is of the order of a few times 10^{−2}.

==== Noise ====
Measurements on submillimeter-wave BWO's (de Graauw et al., 1978) have shown that a signal-to-noise ratio of 120 dB per MHz could be expected in this wavelength range. In heterodyne detection using a BWO as a local oscillator, this figure corresponds to a noise temperature added by the oscillator of only 1000–3000 K.
