= Improved United Kingdom Air Defence Ground Environment =

1990s ground-controlled interception system in the UK

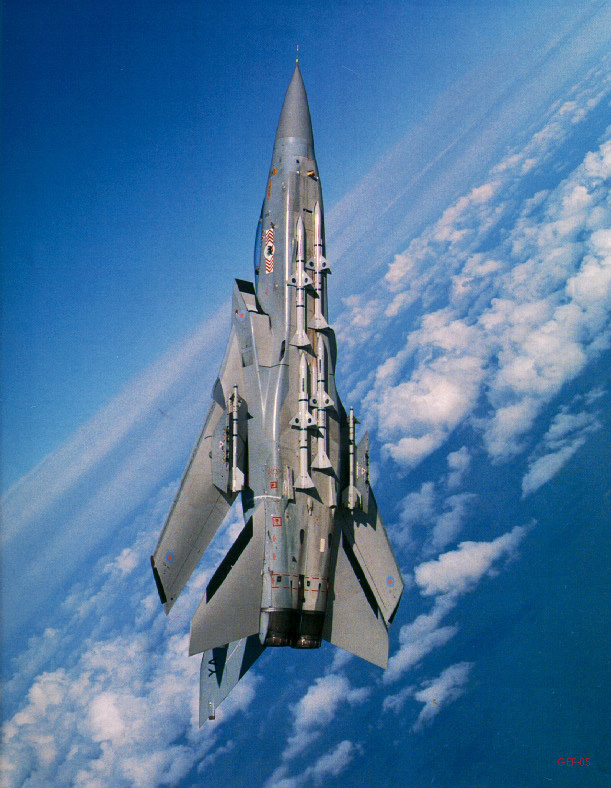
IUKADGE directed Panavia Tornado ADVs (pictured) against targets across the North Sea.

The Improved United Kingdom Air Defence Ground Environment, normally shortened to either UKADGE or IUKADGE, was the Royal Air Force's (RAF) ground-controlled interception system covering the British Isles during the 1990s. It consisted of a number of ground-based radar sites, links to airborne early warning aircraft and Royal Navy ships, a telecommunications system to send digital data and voice communications on a protected network, and processing systems based on VAX-11/780 computers. The network ultimately contained a dozen long-range radars including four Marconi Martello, two General Electric TPS-592, and six Plessey AR-320.

UKADGE was developed in response to concerns about its predecessor, Linesman/Mediator. Linesman started in the 1950s, when it was assumed that any air attack on the UK would be by hydrogen bomb so no effort was made to "harden" the radars or its main control centre as such effort would be futile. By the mid-1960s, with the Soviet Union reaching strategic parity with NATO, such an attack no longer seemed likely; it was assumed a war would have a protracted conventional stage, perhaps never going nuclear. In this environment, the highly exposed Linesman system was a target for attack by conventional weapons.

UKADGE was intended to be highly survivable in this sort of war. It replaced Linesman's fixed communication links with a packet switching network sending data to multiple command centres around the country. Radar sites had the ability to control interceptions by themselves, while the overall recognised air picture was compiled and directed at Strike Command headquarters. To complicate the use of radar jammers, several new radars were introduced that operated across a wide band of frequencies from L to S (C to F in NATO terms). Peacetime radars were located at existing radar sites re-used from Linesman, while additional radars were ready to be set up at pre-surveyed locations.

Like Linesman before it, UKADGE soon ran into major delays. It was not declared operational until 1 June 1993, six years late, by which time the ending of the Cold War had led to a loss in interest in the programme. Even at that date, the system was missing a number of components and required considerable remedial work. By the 2000s, the system was increasingly difficult to maintain as many of the equipment vendors had since gone out of business or abandoned their product lines. In 2001, IBM won a contract to rebuild the command and communications portions of the system, which emerged as the current Air Surveillance and Control System (ASACS), which is in the process of being replaced by the new Project Guardian.

== History ==
=== Defence in the nuclear era ===
In 1957, Duncan Sandys introduced his Defence White Paper which, among other topics, considered the effect of the introduction of ballistic missiles on the UK's defensive posture. Continuing the prevailing notion that any attack on the UK would be nuclear, the paper suggested that future attacks would likely be made by ballistic missiles. As there was no defence against these weapons, (Note: As contemporary research under Violet Friend was demonstrating.) the only possible way to stop them would be to deter them. This meant the V bomber force had to be able to launch with extreme rapidity.

At the time, the Royal Air Force (RAF) had been planning a new nationwide anti-bomber radar network known as Plan Ahead. This was, conceptually, a replacement for the earlier network of AMES Type 80 radars, using fewer but longer-ranged radars. The main goal was to counter the carcinotron jammer, which rendered the Type 80 almost useless. Another problem was the ever-increasing civilian air traffic, which confused the picture seen by the Type 80 operators. Plan Ahead would send all of its information to two underground locations where the radar data would be compared to known civilian flight plans, targets separated out, and directions sent to the interceptor aircraft. It was felt this could only be accomplished at centralised stations that had all of the data on both military and civilian aircraft.

As part of ongoing discussions, brought to a head with the release of the White Paper, Plan Ahead was put in doubt. There was no purpose in defending against bombers if the attack came by missiles, and it seemed unlikely the detection of a bomber attack would not also indicate missiles were on the way. The V bombers would have to launch on any credible sign of an attack in either case. The only clear role for the radars appeared to be to indicate an attack was coming and give time for the V force to launch; actually plotting a response seemed superfluous as the V force would (hopefully) be gone by the time the attack landed.

What was really needed was a new radar dedicated to detecting a missile launch. After rapidly completed negotiations, the United States agreed to move one of their new BMEWS radars to the UK, initially to Scotland, but later to Yorkshire at RAF Fylingdales where it could be better protected. This led to a new concept for Plan Ahead that removed most air defences, and shrunk the area covered by radar to that around the air and missiles bases in the Midlands.

=== Linesman ===
Meanwhile, the level of civilian air traffic was growing rapidly and badly needed new radars and automation. Studies began to see if Plan Ahead could be combined with the air traffic control (ATC) network, allowing both users to share their radar coverage. This concept was accepted, and on 22 February 1961, Plan Ahead became the Linesman half of the Linesman/Mediator system.

As part of this change, the civilian and military sides would have the share data, which resulted in the military centre being moved to London so it could be as close as possible to its civilian counterpart. In the era of a three-day war and attacks by hydrogen bombs, any attempt to harden the centre seemed futile, so the building was located aboveground. The RAF was adamantly opposed to this change, stating that control over the interceptor force should take place at the radar stations so the failure of the centralized centre would not render the system useless at a stroke. The Treasury was unwilling to release any funds for the equipment needed to plot at the radars.

Linesman quickly ran into problems and it was clear by 1964 that it would not be completed on time. Whilst the radar systems were complete by 1968, the computerized systems used to collate the information from them was repeatedly delayed. Much of the blame was laid on Plessey, whose previous experience in telephone switching left them unprepared for the level of programming support needed. Eventually, programmers from the Atomic Weapons Research Establishment had to be sent to help. Meanwhile, because all of the interception task was now moved to a single building, it had to grow much larger. Eventually nine major contractors were working on the system, adding coordination problems.

=== Conventional war ===
While the Linesman installation dragged on, the strategic situation was once again changing. Previously, NATO assumed a tripwire force concept where conventional forces were not expected to actually stop Warsaw Pact forces. Instead, any attack on these forces would be responded to with tactical nuclear weapons against the Pact forces and high-value targets. If this failed to stop the war, a "massive retaliation" using strategic weapons would be launched against the USSR. NATO's massive air superiority ensured the attack would succeed.

In July 1964, the US Joint Chiefs of Staff admitted that the Soviet nuclear forces would survive in enough number to guarantee their own massive retaliation. The US could no longer risk the Soviets using their strategic force and began emphasising their conventional weapons. The UK's own Exercise Hell Tank suggested a 45-to-1 kill ratio for helicopters over tanks, upsetting the entire concept of how to stop a Warsaw Pact invasion. Now it was believed the war would remain conventional for some time, or its entirety.

In this scenario, an air attack on the UK could no longer be assumed to be nuclear and would no longer be deterred by the V bombers. There was nothing to stop the Soviets from attacking the Linesman sites and leaving the UK airspace entirely unprotected. Moreover, new Soviet aircraft with longer range allowed the UK to be approached from across the North Atlantic, where radars had been run down in keeping with Linesman's tripwire concept. This "back door" would allow the west coast to be attacked without any recourse. Other aircraft had the range to operate from Europe and approach the UK at low altitude, where they could not be seen by the Linesman radars, allowing them to be easily attacked.

By 1971 the Linesman software was still nowhere near completion and there were murmurs that the project might be cancelled outright. In 1972, Labour MP Leslie Huckfield described the system as "one of the biggest confidence tricks ever perpetrated in Britain". Further, the systems had been designed for the civilian traffic levels of the 1950s and was now "less than half" what was required, leaving them overwhelmed. One programmer suggested that the system might work properly for about 10 minutes a week.

=== Calls for a new system ===
Starting in 1969, as the full scope of the Linesman disaster became clear, various groups in the RAF called for a major reorganization of the system. The Moulton Report of December 1969 stated that the system would never work as the computers were too overloaded and that the interception task should be moved to the radar sites. Non-essential systems, like digital communications with the fighters, should be abandoned. In September 1971, Air Marshal Sir John Nicholls published a report on Linesman outlining its many problems, notably the lack of coverage in the north and south, and its inability to deal with low-flying targets. The same month, Air commodore John Ellacombe published a similar report that suggested L1 be used for nothing more than the compilation of the recognized air picture and that several new radar stations be added.

In November, RAF Strike Command called for the complete reformation of the entire network. Their plan devolved track assembly to a series of control centres which would forward that data to the Air Defence Centre where the recognized air picture would be assembled, along with the status of the various defensive systems. The Air Defence Commander would then send commands back to the control centres, who would carry out the interceptions.

They also suggested abandoning the complex transmission system built for Linesman. This worked by capturing the entire "video" signal being sent to a cathode ray tube display, using it to frequency modulate a microwave signal, and then sending the resulting signal to L1 using wideband microwave relays. Operators at L1 would then see the radar signals as they were at the stations, and use them to extract "tracks" of interest. However, this was forwarded to L1 using the BT Tower, which could be easily jammed by aiming a transmitter at it, as well as costing a lot of money to maintain. Strike Command noted that if the track extraction was being carried out at the radar stations, the resulting information, essentially an ID number, location and direction, could easily be sent in digital format over conventional telephone lines or narrow-band microwave links, as was being done in NADGE. Finally, they called for the replacement of the huge and costly radars like the AMES Type 85 with a greater number of simpler and cheaper systems.

=== IUKADGE takes shape ===
In January 1972, before Linesman was even operational, the ADGE System Study Group was organized to replace it. Their first report was delivered on 1 May 1972, and was largely a list of the problems in Linesman; low-level coverage was largely nonexistent, high-level coverage was limited in the north and south, L1 was highly vulnerable, and the data L1 collected was not available at Air Defence headquarters at RAF High Wycombe, only at L1 itself.

The report also contained a longer consideration of the methods of sending track data around the system. They felt that advances in technology were making automatic track extraction possible and would significantly reduce total manpower. They also considered the low-level problem, examining solutions in the form of over-the-horizon radars, radars on oil platforms, and distributed systems run by the Royal Observer Corps. They ultimately concluded that the only practical solution was airborne early warning.

The final report, referring to the existing system as UKADGE, was published in August 1972. (Note: Depending on the source, the "improved" refers to the entire system or the system after the addition of the new radars. Given the new radars were installed long before the networking systems were complete, the confusion in the name may be due to the timing. It may also be nothing more than different sources including or excluding the I.) This suggested that there should be no changes to the existing radar sites other than the replacement of outdated systems like the AMES Type 13 with their modern replacements like the Decca HF200. The "back door" approach over the North Sea and Norwegian coast would be closed with radars at Buchan and in the Hebrides, and the southern area at Burrington, while another new radar would replace the Type 80 at Saxa Vord but officially be part of NADGE and paid for by NATO funds. Data from NADGE, Royal Navy ships and newly purchased airborne radar aircraft would also be injected into the network by radio links, and distributed over various telecommunications systems.

On 18 December 1972, the Air Force Board accepted the reports and decided "that Phase 1 of the LINESMAN project should be completed but that, after commissioning, the L1 building should be operated and manned on only a limited basis ... Emphasis was to be placed on keeping expenditure to a minimum and high priority was to be given to the development of an alternative - less vulnerable - air defence system." Linesman was effectively being killed off. Several more commissioning dates came and went, until it was finally declared operational, in a limited form, on 21 March 1974.

With the acceptance of the need for a new system, in 1972 Strike Command formed the Air Defence Environment Team, or ADET, to define a formal proposal and liaise with industry during construction. In the mid-1970s, Plessey won a contract to consider new layouts for the network. Their reports suggested that advances in computers and communications made a flexible system possible. After five years, ADET received Air Force Board approval and the organization moved to the Ministry of Defence (MoD) in 1977.

=== Formal definition ===
In 1979, a formal Air Staff Requirement 888 was issued for bids. ASR.888 defined the Improved Command and Control System, or ICCS, the network and computer systems that would connect together the various radar sites and control centres. It also defined the consoles that would be used to display that data. Two major bids were received, and in September 1980 the contract was won by the newly formed UKADGE Systems Limited, a consortium of Hughes Aircraft, Marconi and Plessey. The only significant competition was a similar bid led by Thomson-CSF which included International Computers Limited. The formal signing took place in 1981.

Development overall was directed by Hughes, who selected the recently introduced VAX-11/780 minicomputer as the basis of the system. Marconi was to supply the display consoles and the voice communications systems. Plessey was to deliver a processor for the consoles which would handle the graphics display, and the digital communications switching systems.

ASR.888 described a system with twelve main locations. Strike Command headquarters would host the Air Defence Operations Centre (ADOC), while ROC headquarters at RAF Bentley Priory would host the backup Standby ADOC. The ADOCs were in charge of the overall command of the defence response and the maintenance of the recognized air picture, which would be fed data on civilian flights and jammer activity from the existing L1 site. The direct control of the aircraft and missiles would be handled at two Sector Operations Centres (SOCs) and their two backup Control and Reporting Centres (CRCs). Additional control consoles would be placed at four of the radar stations to form the Control and Reporting Posts (CRPs) while a further two radar sites lacking control posts would be known as Reporting Posts (RPs).

The SOCs and CRCs would each have five VAX computers, two for processing the input/output from the network, one for processing radar data into tracks, one for processing jammer tracking, and the last for "general housekeeping" and as a warm-failover if any of the others failed. Data from the systems was sent to the Marconi consoles, which were based around a 22 inches (560 mm) round four-colour display with two smaller monochrome text displays, "totes", one on either side. Each station also had four wall-sized four-colour displays, used primarily for presenting the recognized air picture and the status of available defences.

After some time, the data and voice system was spun off to its own project, Uniter, which moved to GEC. Uniter was an early implementation of a nationwide packet switching system based on the concepts recently introduced by the NPL network in the early 1970s. GEC had produced a commercial implementation for British Telecom known as "System X" and proposed the same basic concept for Uniter. In addition to the land links, the SOCs and CRCs also had microwave links into the British Army's Boxer network.

In addition to the network itself, numerous additional Requirements followed for other parts of the system. ASR.894 described the network interface that would connect ICCS the UK's Link 11 being used by the Nimrod AEW3 aircraft. ASR.1585 called for transportable L-band radars, while ASR.1586 was a similar requirement for S-band systems. As had been the case in Linesman, widely separated bands would be used in order to make the jamming task more difficult.

At the time, the system was to be delivered in five years, in September 1986, at an estimated price of US$240 million.

=== Construction ===
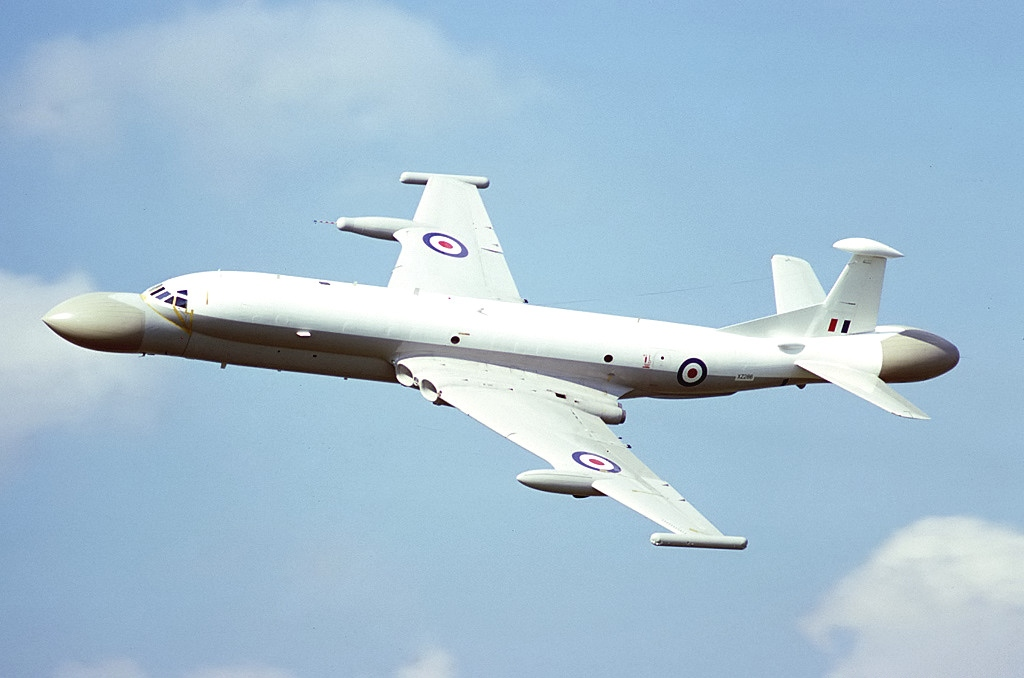
The failure of the Nimrod AEW3 project was one of the many significant setbacks for the UKADGE programme.

The L-band radar component was quickly awarded to the Marconi Martello system, a recently introduced design of some sophistication, while the NATO-funded sites would make use of the US-built AN/TPS-59 in its GE592 guise. The selection of the corresponding S-band system was more contentious, with Plessey offering to merge their somewhat dated AR-3D receiver and display electronics with a new transmitter and antenna from ITT-Gilfillan to produce the AR-320, which competed against the Hughes Air Defense Radar. Political wrangling, and Hughes' self-interest, delayed the selection for months, before it was ultimately won by the AR-320 based on hopes for additional export sales to NATO. The Martello systems had a relatively easy development and all four were delivered in 1986. The AR-320s were new, and the six systems were not delivered until 1988/89.

By this time, the Nimrod AEW3 was running into significant problems. While the first example was delivered in March 1982, and the first production versions were delivered to No. 8 Squadron RAF in 1984, by this time the aircraft was already several years late and had missed its chance to be used in the Falklands War. Instead, No. 8 was flying surplus Avro Shackletons hastily equipped for the AEW role using the electronics from the Fairey Gannet. As the delays mounted, and with the ground radars already being delivered, in December 1986 the MoD cancelled the Nimrod in favour of the Boeing E-3 Sentry. This required the Shackletons to remain in service until the Sentries arrived.

In 1987 the decision was made to add a passive tracking system for anti-jammer support. This had been an important part of the Linesman concept, where the Type 85 radars operated as one-half of two-station triangulation systems. With the Type 85s due to pass out of service with the commissioning of the AR-320s, a new system would be needed to fill this role. Additionally, a requirement for decoy transmitters was added, both to further confuse jammer systems as well as to provide multiple targets to anti-radiation missiles. Meanwhile, the TPS-592 radars, which should have been easily adapted from their US counterparts, ran into extensive delays due to the need to meet more stringent operational requirements, and ultimately took five years to pass tests.

In late 1988, statements from one of the UKADGE members stated that the ICCS was "currently in the pre-technical transfer phase", with reports stating that it was far short of its requirements and could not be available before mid-1992. Other members of the consortium debated this and stated it would be available in 1990, but in April 1989 the MoD made it official and stated it was not expected to be fully operational until 1992. At least some of the problem was identified as the system using three different programming languages, CORAL, FORTRAN and RTL/2, which led to a study into the feasibility of replacing all of these with the newly introduced Ada. This study concluded it would be extremely expensive and could only be contemplated as part of a mid-1990s mid-life upgrade.

One of the key aspects of the system was the incorporation of data from airborne early warning aircraft. After considering several alternatives, the Nimrod AEW3 had been selected. Individual "blips" (Note: Warwick refers to these as "strobes".) on the radars would be forwarded over the UK-developed Link 11 system to the CPRs, where they would be injected into the system as if they were data from any other radar. The blips would then be sent into the processors for track extraction. The system also needed to be able to receive data from the NATO AEW aircraft, also E-3 Sentry's, which used the new JTIDS communication system. The Sentry had onboard computer equipment which did track identification, forwarding only the processed tracks, not the individual "blips" on the radar screens.

Under Project Cheek, formalized as Air Staff Requirement 894, a Thorn-EMI system would receive data from either aircraft and display it on a separate console. The operator would then copy data from the console into the main UKADGE consoles manually. With the cancellation of the Nimrod AEW, the UK also moved to the Sentry. In October 1989, the RAF announced it would be installing the JTIDS/Link 16 system on their Sentry and Tornado aircraft, as well as their air tanker fleet. The idea was that the tankers would be used as relay stations for the distant Tornado interceptors. Unfortunately, the existing ASR.894 design was not capable of relaying the number of messages this would require, and it was estimated this could not be added before 2005.

=== Delivery ===
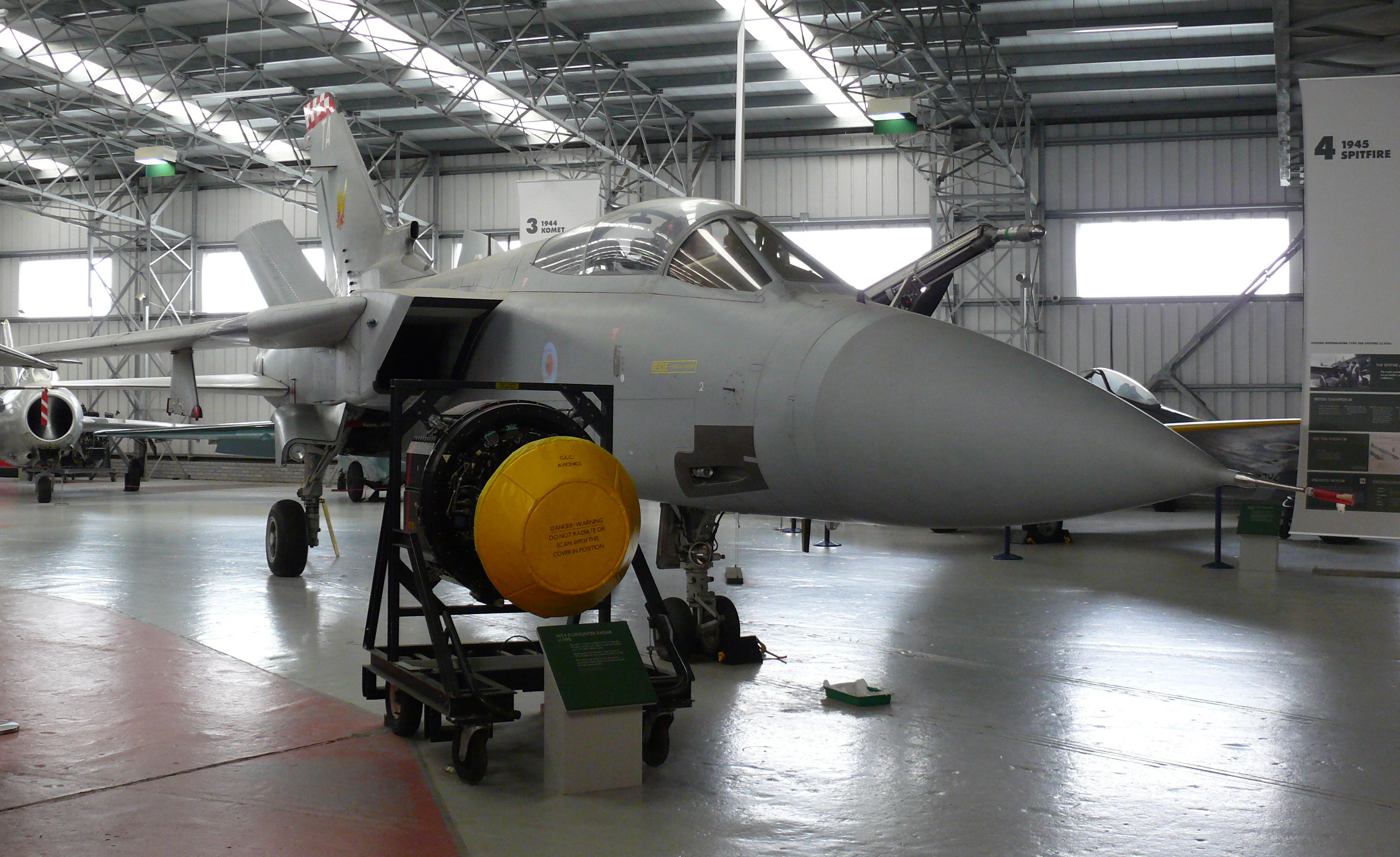
The Foxhunter radar proved to be another major problem during development, but unlike Nimrod, corrective action eventually produced a usable product.

By 1988, the system was already eighteen months behind schedule. All three key technologies of the system were missing; the Nimrod AEW had been cancelled, the ICCS didn't work, and Foxhunter radar for the interceptor version of the Panavia Tornado, Tornado ADV was non-functional.

As had occurred with Linesman, chatter in government circles started about cancelling the system. Donald Spiers, the MoD's controller of aircraft, called for an internal audit of the programme. In June 1989, the MoD formed a new project known as TRIAD, short for Techniques for Realizing an Integrated Air Defence, in an effort to get the system up and running as quickly as possible. Plessey, Ferranti and Thorn-EMI all won contracts to study the idea of connecting new processors to the ICCS network through a public interface. Serious consideration was also given to simply cancelling the entire system outright, writing off the approximately $600 million US spent to date.

It was at this time that Hughes sent in Nancy Price, a corporate troubleshooter, to get things moving again. She put the problems squarely on the organizational structure, "UKSL fought about whether it was my fault or your fault - we had to change the culture of the organization."

Significant progress was seen in 1990 when deliveries of the Sentries began. The first arrived at RAF Waddington on 4 July 1990, a month ahead of schedule, and the last in March 1992. Enough had arrived by June 1991 that the Shackletons were finally retired. A force of six active Sentries with another as a hot spare took over most of the air control duty.

While the Sentries were arriving, the first all-up tests of the ICCS system were being carried out at the Sector Operations Centre at Buchan. These went relatively smoothly until they attempted to network other SOCs into the system, at which point all of the machines crashed. A key improvement was realized by replacing the now-outdated VAX 11/780 and 11/785 machines with the newer VAX 8650. The 8650, originally known as the 11/795, ran at 18 MHz rather than the 780's 5 or the 785's 7.5, offering well over twice the performance. Problems keeping the three sites in sync disappeared, along with the crashes, and this also allowed a reduction in the number of machines at each site.

By the middle of 1991, the MoD was increasingly confident the system was finally ready for operation. Buchan SOC was handed over to the RAF on 27 September 1991. During early development, a backup site for Neatishead had been added to the original plans, whereas previously Boulmer had been the backup to both SOCs. After several abandoned bunkers from the ROTOR programme were examined, the complex from RAF Sandwich was selected and became the new RAF Ash. Construction work to enlarge the bunker began in 1984. This also became the Operational Conversion Unit (OCU) for radar operators migrating from Linesman to UKADGE. It operated in this role until 1 October 1993, when the School of Fighter Control moved from RAF West Drayton to Boulmer and the OCU moved with it. Ultimately Ash was never used as an operational UKADGE SOC, and the bunker was left half-converted with much of its equipment abandoned in a pile at the site. Ash closed in 1995 and was later sold.

Extensive remedial changes to the software of the ICCS continued and a major update was officially delivered in September 1992. The other SOCs and CRCs followed, and the entire system was declared fully operational on 1 June 1993, "a mere six years behind schedule". The MoD credited the final competition of the system to Price, who went on to become the president of Hughes Canada, building the Canadian Automated Air Traffic System. By the time the system was complete, US$1.6 billion had been spent, against initial estimates of US$240 million. Ultimately about half of the funding came from the NATO pool, including 80% of the cost of the radars.

=== History repeats ===
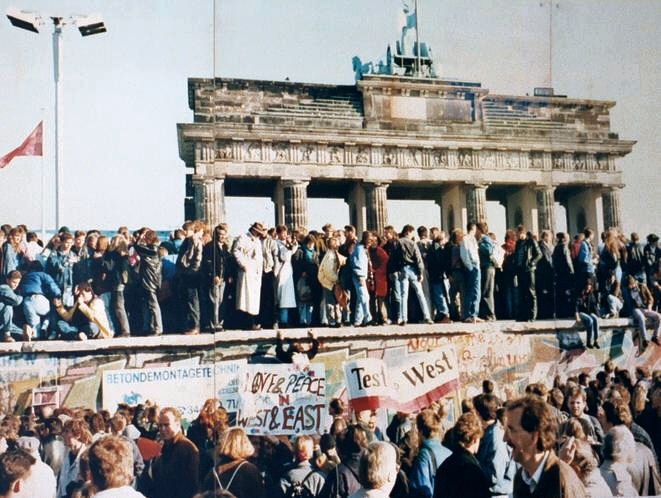
The Warsaw Pact proved unable to prevent even their own citizens from defeating their security apparatus; the threat to the UK from their aircraft no longer seemed important.

By the time the system was finally delivered, IUKADGE was seen as obsolete. The Warsaw Pact had been falling apart through the late 1980s, and in 1991 the Soviet Union officially ceased to exist. As the Russian economy faltered, the number of intruder flights plummeted, from about five a week in 1980, to zero. The system, designed to track long-range, low-flying aircraft and their cruise missile weapons, no longer had a credible target. Addressing even an all-out attack would require a system much less extensive than IUKADGE, and the need for significant redundancy no longer seemed pressing.

Moreover, many of the systems used in the ICCS, notably the VAX computers, were no longer available. These machines, which filled small rooms, had been replaced by ever-smaller systems, and eventually by emulators running on desktop platforms. The networking systems of ICCS, which initially required entire computers of their own, could now be implemented in small boxes, while the underlying network system was being outperformed by commercial networks that could be purchased over the counter.

=== Replacement ===
While the system was being brought up, there were already discussions about its future. The UKSL consortium members were invited to submit bids on maintaining the systems, either individually or as the UKSL group. The MoD eventually decided to abandon the UKSL given its poor performance before the arrival of Price, who had since left. In the meantime, in January 1993 bids were taken to replace the GE592 systems, which was awarded to Plessey in 1994 with a further updated version of the AR-320, the AR-327.

In June 1996 the MoD announced the IUKADGE system would be replaced outright. This was formalized in Staff Requirement (Air) 1303, which called for a single Joint Force Air Component Headquarters that would run the RAF in both the UK and also be deployable overseas, and a separate Tactical Air Control Centre to direct fighter operations. The JFAC was estimated to be running by 1998 and the entire system by 2003. This programme also ran into significant delays, this time mostly due to a lack of interest as Russian activity remained low. It eventually emerged as the Air Surveillance and Control System (ASACS).

== Description ==
The main portion of the UKADGE network consisted of a group of transportable radar systems and a computer network to transmit data between them. From north to south, the radar stations were:

- Sornfelli, on Streymoy in the Faroe Islands operated by Denmark as part of NATO
- RAF Saxa Vord in the Shetland Islands
- RAF Benbecula in the Outer Hebrides
- RAF Buchan in Scotland, which was also the northern sector SOC
- RAF Boulmer in Northumberland
- RAF Bishops Court in Northern Ireland
- RAF Staxton Wold in Yorkshire, downgraded to a radar station only
- RAF Neatishead in Norfolk, the southern sector SOC
- RAF Portreath in Cornwall

In addition to the radar stations, several other stations were included:

- RAF High Wycombe, RAF Strike Command headquarters, hosted the Air Defence Operations Centre
- RAF Bentley Priory, Royal Observer Corps headquarters, was the Standby ADOC
- RAF Ash was the backup southern sector control, but never operated in that role
- RAF West Drayton, the former L1 of Linesman, remained in use as the military air traffic control centre (ETF)

UKADGE was linked to a number of similar networks as well. These included:

- NADGE at Glons, Nieuw Milligen, Vedbaek, Maakeroy, Graakallen and Reitan
- STRIDA II in Tours and Doullens
- Link 11 and Link 16 connections to AEW aircraft and Royal Navy ships

A total of twelve ground radars were purchased as part of the network. These included four Martello S723s, known as AMES Type 91 in the RAF's radar numbering scheme, two GE592 as Type 92, and six AR320 as Type 93. The GE592s were used at Boulmer and Benbecula.
