= Marconi Martello =

Family of phased array radar systems

Martello
- Country of origin: UK
- Manufacturer: Marconi
- Introduced: 1982
- No. built: 22 (as of 2003)
- Type: early warning, tactical control
- Frequency: 23 cm, L band (NATO D band)
- PRF: 250 pps
- Beamwidth: 2.8º horizontal, 1.5º vertical (S713); 1.6º/~3º (S723)
- Pulsewidth: 10 μS (S713), 150 μS (S723)
- RPM: 6
- Range: 256 nautical miles (474 km; 295 mi) on a 1 square metre (11 sq ft) target
- Altitude: 150,000 ft (46,000 m)
- Azimuth: 360º
- Elevation: -2º to 30º
- Precision: range resolution ~450 ft
- Power: 3.3 MW (S713), 132 kW (S723)
- Other names: S713, S723, S743; AMES Type 90, AMES Type 91; S763/Ceselsa LANZA

Martello is a family of phased array radar systems developed by Marconi Electronic Systems in the 1970s and introduced operationally in the early 1980s. They provided long-range early warning capabilities but also had the accuracy needed for interception plotting and "putting on" of other weapons systems like surface-to-air missiles. The name comes from the Martello towers that provided defence in earlier years.

A key feature of the new design was its solution to measuring altitude. Earlier mechanically scanned 3D radars used multiple feed horns in a vertical stack, but this was difficult to make in a mobile form; when moved they would go out of alignment. Newer phased arrays used electronic phase shifters to sweep up and down to measure angles, but this required expensive electronics. Martello used fixed phase shifters to produce a pattern of eight stacked beams, recreating the multiple feed horn pattern in a small box that was inexpensive to implement.

The system was initially offered to the RAF, whose Linesman radar network was the subject of much concern over its survivability due to its fixed locations and single control centre in London. It was suggested it should be replaced as quickly as possible by a mobile, distributed system. Around the same time, NATO was beginning the process of upgrading their Europe-wide radar network, NADGE, and their basic requirements were similar to the UK's. Martello was conceived to fill both requirements.

The first S713 was introduced in 1978 and entered RAF service in 1982 as the AMES Type 90. Changes to the NATO specification led to the S723, introduced in 1984 and entering service with the RAF in 1986 as the AMES Type 91. The S723, and product-improved S743 version found a number of international buyers. At least 22 systems of the S700 family have been produced through 2003. The Lockheed Martin AN/TPS-77 has replaced the Martellos in the UK, as the AMES Type 92.

== History ==
=== S600 ===
Marconi was the leading supplier of ground-based radars in the UK for many years, mostly working with designs developed at the Royal Radar Establishment (RRE) and its predecessors. These generally used large radars for 2D scanning to a plan-position indicator (PPI) display and separate height finding radars for measuring target altitudes.

In the early 1960s, the company carried out several industry studies to better understand the future market. A new product concept emerged from this process, a long-range air-scanning radar to provide battlefield overview and early warning, what the British Army called a tactical control radar. The key feature was mobility; the design had to be able to be pulled by Land Rovers, slung under a Sea King helicopter, and fit within a single C-130 Hercules aircraft. The design also intended to use the same components to serve different roles, including air traffic control and fixed-place systems.

It combined a traditional rotating radar scanner for detection and measurement of bearing with one or more height finder radars to measure altitude. A unique feature was that the main scanner optionally mounted two antennas back-to-back and could be operated in the S band and L band at the same time. Advanced moving target indication (MTI) systems were also included to suppress clutter.

This concept emerged as the Marconi S600, which was first announced in May 1967 and demonstrated at the 1968 Farnborough Air Show. Orders began to arrive almost immediately, and over the next several years the company sold 74 systems worth over £100 million to 15 countries around the world. This was a huge success, especially given the £2.5 million cost of developing the system.

=== 3D scanning ===
In the late 1960s a similar study started to look for new product lines to supplant or even replace the S600. This process produced several new requirements; like the S600, the system should be mobile or at least transportable, that it have improved jamming resistance, and that the era of the 2D radar and separate height finder used in the S600 was over and that the new design had to have a single 3D antenna. Normally a search radar's beam is shaped like a fan, very narrow from side to side in order to accurately determine bearing, and very wide top to bottom in order to catch any aircraft no matter its altitude. (Note: Or in the case of a height-finding radar, the beam is very narrow vertically to accurately determine altitude angle and wide side-to-side to find the target.) If one desires to accurately measure altitude with the same radar, the beam will need to be narrow in both directions, producing a "pencil beam" that has to be scanned in both directions.

Marconi had worked on 3D systems in the past, notably the Orange Yeoman radar of the early 1960s. These used multiple feed horns to generate a series of pencil beams, each at a different vertical angle. The waveguide network and horns were complex and had to be accurately aligned during setup and maintenance, and a version robust enough to be mobile would be difficult to build. Another concern was the feedhorns generated side lobes with the first lobe on the order of -20 to -25 dB of the main beam. This meant that radar jammers were picked up multiple times as the radar rotated, both in the main beam and the sidelobes.

Since that time a number of new solutions for 3D scanning had emerged. The primary one used phased arrays and shifted the frequency of the radar to produce a beam that could be steered entirely in electronics. However, using contemporary electronics, this was very expensive and was still being used only in high-end designs. One could also achieve the same basic goal by careful arrangement of the waveguides and antennas, a concept known as "squint", such that changing the frequency caused the entire beam to rotate vertically. This was being used for civilian radar systems like air traffic control, but for military use this system resulted in any particular aircraft always seeing the same frequency, which make it easier to jam. Among squint-steering's notable successes was the Plessey AR-3D.

In 1965 by the Royal Radar Establishment began development of an advanced 3D concept as the Storage Array Radar, or STAR. In 1970 the RRE gave Marconi a contract to develop a prototype of a commercial version of STAR, using an S600 transmitter with a new phased receiver that could be offered as an upgrade to existing S600 systems. Ultimately the system instead demonstrated that the concept was too costly to be economically attractive. This early work continued to be supported through the 1970s.

=== New concept ===
The majority of the cost of the STAR system was the complex signal handling system. This had to store the received returns over the entire period of the transmission pulse and then correlate the returns in that signal using a series of variable signal delays. In the new concept, the variable delays of STAR would instead fixed and produce a series of fixed-angle vertical lobes. Horizontal scanning would be achieved as it had in the past, by rotating the entire antenna array.

Such a system can steer the beam vertically by delaying the signal as it is sent to the elements, and this phased array radar concept was being actively researched, especially in the United States. However, this required each element to have its own transmitter as well as receiver, and in the era of electronics made of individual transistors, these were very expensive. In contrast, Marconi's concept sent out a single fan-shaped beam as in STAR, and required only the receivers to be individual to each element.

After conversion to the IF, the signal from each element was sent into a series of fixed delays, the "beam-forming network". These mixed the signals from different sections of the array, creating outputs that were sensitive in certain directions. The end result was a series of outputs, nine in the original design, eight of which were aimed in a different vertical direction while the ninth was an all-sky beam used for early detection.

The aimed outputs were identical to those created by the separate physical feed horns in a system like Orange Yeoman, but implemented completely in electronics in a box about the size of a minibar. The system could be re-purposed to provide more vertical coverage or change the coverage pattern by replacing this box, with no changes to the antenna. Altitude information was extracted as it had been in Orange Yeoman; comparing a received pulse's strength in adjacent outputs allowed the vertical angle to be measured with some degree of accuracy. Such systems are known as "stacked beam radars".

=== Linesman and UKADGE ===
While development on new 3D systems continued, the Royal Air Force (RAF) was in the final stages of the installation of its latest radar network, Linesman. Linesman had been designed in 1958, in the era when the NATO response to any attack by the Warsaw Pact would be widespread use of its overwhelming superiority in air power to deliver tactical nuclear weapons against high-value targets. Any attack on the UK was assumed to be by bombers carrying strategic-sized hydrogen bombs, so no attempt had been made to harden the radar sites or the single centralized command center, L1 - if there were bombs falling, the defence had failed and there was no point trying to protect it further.

By the late 1960s, the USSR was reaching some level of parity in both tactical and strategic weapons, and the idea that any war in Europe would be met by the early use of nuclear bombs was obsolete. If the war was going to stay conventional, the USSR could easily risk an attack on Linesman with no fear of triggering a nuclear response. The RAF had long complained that the L1 station was highly vulnerable to any form of attack, even a truck filled with explosives, and the shore-side location of the radars made them easy to attack by low-flying aircraft. They repeatedly demanded that control of the interceptor aircraft take place at the radar stations rather than L1, ensuring that a single attack would not destroy the entire network. Even more worrying was that the data was communicated over microwave relay, which opened it to the possibility of being jammed, rendering the entire network useless.

Other changes through this period including the new "plot extraction" systems that were highly effective at picking out moving aircraft, especially when they combined the information from more than one radar. By digitizing this data early in the process, it could be passed from site to site using modems on conventional telephones lines, which would provide much higher security and some level of redundancy. (Note: Ironically, the security of the system was later learned to rely on a line that ran in a manhole directly outside the Soviet embassy in London.) The pan-European counterpart to Linesman, NADGE, had semi-automated this process, but Linesman lacked the ability to read this data and plots being forwarded from NADGE had to be entered manually by voice telephone calls.

Starting in 1972, the government redirected the money originally earmarked for upgrades to the Linesman system to be used to replace it as soon as possible with a new network known as UKADGE. Marconi joined a consortium with Hughes Aircraft and Plessey which won the contract to supply the networking systems, with Marconi supplying over 200 of the standardized operator terminals based on their Locus 16 computers.

=== Rampart ===
Marconi saw the introduction of the UKADGE system as an opportunity to make practical use of their stacked-beam design. They proposed a new radar with the same performance as the Linesman radars, but in a form that was semi-mobile, or "transportable" in UK parlance. Backup systems could be stored away from the radar stations and then set up rapidly in the event the station was attacked. Chain Home had only survived attacks by the Luftwaffe due to the availability of backup radar systems that could be put into operation within hours, and Marconi noted their design could offer the same capability.

The proposal generated considerable interest and was formalized in 1973 as "Rampart". As Rampart was generally designed to meet the performance of the Type 85 and Type 84 radars of Linesman, it had several specific requirements. Among them was a very high maximum scanning angle to allow it to track aircraft as they passed overhead at high altitudes, rapid scanning to provide up-to-date data as interceptor aircraft approached their targets, and a range on the order of 240 nautical miles (440 km; 280 mi), matching the Type 85. In 1975 they began building a prototype version for this mission, which became the Improved UKADGE (IUKADGE) project.

=== S713 ===
Although the UK was playing catch-up to NADGE with UKADGE, NADGE itself began its own upgrade process as well. Like UKADGE, this called for mobile radar systems and a decentralized command and control network. Preliminary specifications for the new radars had been released in 1973, and it appeared Rampart could be adapted to the NATO standard.

One part of the standard specified the use of the S band for the radars. Marconi suggested using the L band instead, which would require much less power to reach the same range. This is a side-effect of the free-space path loss, which states that the energy captured by an antenna varies with the square of the wavelength, meaning that longer wavelengths are more efficiently received on an antenna of the same size. Longer wavelengths also suffer less reflection from very small objects like raindrops, making their performance in bad weather much better.

The UK Ministry of Defence took up their cause within NATO, and in 1974 the requirement for S band was dropped. At this point, Marconi had what appeared to be a sure contract win with the RAF but that would be a small number of radars; Linesman had only three main sites and two secondaries. They also had what they believed was winner for the NADGE requirement. Based on this, they began development of a design specifically meant to meet the still-emerging NATO standard, which became Martello. The prototype, (Note: Or possibly the "environmental test model".) known as model S713, was shown at the Farnborough Air Show in 1978.

IUKADGE was formalized as Air Staff Requirement 1586, which called for two D band radars and another three E/F band ones. (Note: During this period, NATO introduced new terminology for the various radar bands, with the D band covering a portion of the former L, and E/F covering a portion of the former S.) Marconi won the contract for the D band with S713, whilst Plessey won the contract for the E/F band systems with a modified version of their civilian frequency-scanned systems. Further expansion was carried out using NATO funding as part of NADGE, leading to three further units which were installed in remote locations.

=== S723 ===
By 1978 the NADGE process had produced a rather different set of updated requirements and the S713 was not able to meet the new specifications. Among the changes was the demand for higher angular resolution, while the required vertical angle resolution was relaxed. Feeling they still had a high chance of winning contracts for NADGE, Marconi took it upon themselves to develop a new version of the same basic system to meet the new requirements, the S723.

During this period, semiconductor technology had been improving dramatically, especially in the high-power market where transistors were now available that were capable of controlling tens of kilowatts of power. Marconi decided to modify the original design by replacing the single twystron with a series of individual transistorized transmitter modules, one on each horizontal row. These had significantly less power output, even in aggregate, so to meet the range requirements the pulse length was extended. This would normally result in less range resolution, but this was addressed with pulse compression in the receiver, compressing the 150 μs pulse to 0.25 μs, the same length as the compressed pulse in the S713.

To meet the angular resolution requirement, the number of antennas per row was doubled to 40 and the arms themselves made longer to hold them. Fewer arms were needed as the vertical coverage was not as great, and the number of outputs from the beam-forming network could be reduced to as few as six. The total area of the antenna increased from 700 square feet (65 m^{2}) in the S713 to 960 square feet (89 m^{2}) in the S723. The combination of the larger antenna aperture and newer electronics lowering the noise factor from 4 to 2.5 dB, resulted in the detection range increasing from just over 200 nautical miles (370 km; 230 mi) in the S713 to over 250 nautical miles (460 km; 290 mi) in the S723, in spite of the reduction in peak power from 3 MW to only 132 kW.

The changes in electronics also resulted in a smaller system overall. The main spar now carried all of the electronics and no longer required the separate transmitter semi-trailer, and all of the processing and display was reduced to a single ISO container. This, along with the reduction in module count, reduced the setup time significantly. Lacking a single transmitter, the system could continue operating with as many as three elements out of service. The redesign also gave time to design packaging changes so the entire assembly now fit onto the antenna trailer and two 30 foot (9.1 m) ISO containers.

S723 was introduced at the September 1984 Farnborough show. The RAF ordered four, and the first was delivered in June 1986. By 1989 the RAF had accepted the S713 in service as the AMES Type 90, and the S723s as the AMES Type 91. Another was ordered using NATO funds for installation in the Faroe Islands and operated by the Royal Danish Air Force but feeding its data into the RAF's UKADGE system.

Martello initially won only a single contract outside the UK under NADGE; the Royal Danish Air Force ordered an S723 which they sited on the island of Bornholm mounted on a tall tower. The first sale outside of NATO was the July 1985 sale to the Sultanate of Oman of two S713s, delivered in 1987/88. The Royal Jordanian Air Force ordered an unknown number in 1986.

=== S743 and S753 ===
By the late 1980s, new designs using active electronically scanned arrays for 3D scanning were becoming more widely available and the Martello design began to look dated. In response, Marconi began an upgrade process to produce the S743. This system was similar to the S723 in most ways, but introduced an entirely new data processing side that further improved performance and reliability. Greece ordered two S-743Ds with an option for a third in March 1990, and exercised the option to purchase a third radar in March 1995. Part of the modernisation efforts of Hellenic Air Force's 2nd NARCS included the installation of the S-743D with the system entering service with the unit in May 1996. The estimated total of Greece's procurement was $11 million (1995 dollars) per unit.

In 1988, Marconi was part of wide-reaching deal with Malaysia which delivered two S743's in 1992. Thailand chose the S743 over the US-built AN/FPS-117, concluding that two Martellos would provide the same coverage as three FPSs. A contract for four S743's for the Philippines was canceled in December 1995.

Marconi introduced the S753 derivative at the September 1992 Farnborough Air Show. This was a reduced-resolution version of the system that was much smaller physically and thus easier to set up. It is not clear if any were sold.

In 1998, GEC-Marconi and Alenia-Finmeccanica joined to produce Alenia Marconi Systems. They made their first sale in 1999, supplying two S743-D radars to Oman in 2002. No further sales of the system are known, as the new company had better success with their Selex RAT-31 system which had fully active scanning and won a number of contracts. Forecast International estimates that 22 S723's were produced.

=== S763 Lanza ===
In 1994, Marconi partnered with Ceselsa (today known as indra) to produce a new version of Martello for the Spanish market. This produced the S763, or LANZA as it is known in Spain. It is most similar to the S753 as it also uses the reduced module stack of 32 elements, but the new electronics increases mean power slightly to 5.35 kW.

The Spanish Air Force ultimately purchased 10 units for their SIMCA radar network, which the first unit entering service in 2000. This led to a further version with reduced stack height of only 16 elements, the LANZA-MRR (for Medium Range Radar), with the original retroactively becoming LANZA-LRR. The MRR comes in two forms, one on a trailer that combines the entire system and can be set up and run as soon as power is supplied, and a similar version for use as a long-range naval radar.

== Description ==
=== S713 ===
S713
- Frequency: D-band
- PRF: 250 p.p.s.
- Pulsewidth: 10 μs
- RPM: 6 rpm
- Range: 1–256 nmi (1.2–294.6 mi)
- Altitude: 200,000 ft (61,000 m) max
- Height: 6.1 m (20 ft)
- Width: 10.6 m (35 ft)
- Azimuth: 2.8º
- Elevation: 0-30º
- Power: 3 MW max, 8-10 kW mean

The original S713 design used a series of sixty 20 feet (6.1 m) wide horizontal arms, each holding 32 dipole antennas. These were clustered together into "modules" of five horizontal arms each, producing twelve removable panels that could be stacked on a flatbed trailer for shipping. The antenna modules were designed to withstand 150 miles per hour (240 km/h) winds and the turntable had to retain their proper pointing angle at up to 100 miles per hour (160 km/h). They were also required to hold 4,000 pounds per cubic foot (64 g/cm^{3}) of ice with a total load of 2 short tons (1.8 t). A separate secondary surveillance radar (SSR) was normally mounted on top.

The modules were mounted onto a 35 feet (11 m) vertical spine that was mounted on a turntable to provide azimuth scanning. The transmitted pulse was sent into a waveguide running along the spine through a rotating waveguide joint. The spine was raised using a hydraulic ram and stabilized with swing-out legs with their own rams for leveling. Installing the modules, raising the spine and connecting the systems together took about six hours. (Note: Wood states setup time is five hours for six men., Forecast says six hours.)

The beam-forming network produced nine stacked beams for altitude measurements. A single 3 MW twystron provided power to the entire set of 1920 antennas via the waveguide in the spine. The transmitter was large enough that it required its own semi-trailer, the main vertical spine and turntable were another separate semi-trailer, and the module stack another. Another ISO container held the electronics, communications, and the operator consoles, another the generator, and finally a custom trailer held the modules during shipping.

The system used pulses of 10 μs at about 250 pulses per second, for a mean transmitted power of about 10 kW. The beamwidth is 2.8º horizontal, and 1.5º vertical (at the horizon). It has a maximum detection range of about 220 nautical miles (410 km; 250 mi) at 2º above the horizon. At its maximum altitude angle 30º it can detect targets up to 150,000 ft altitude at a range of 50 nautical miles (93 km; 58 mi). Altitude accuracy was about 1000 ft at 100 nautical miles (190 km; 120 mi).

=== S723 ===
S723
- Frequency: D-band
- RPM: 6 rpm
- Range: 14–256 nmi (26–474 km)
- Altitude: 150,000 ft (46,000 m) max
- Height: 12.2 m (40 ft)
- Width: 7.1 m (23 ft)
- Azimuth: 1.4°
- Elevation: 0-20°
- Power: 132 kW max, 5 kW mean

To meet the requirement for additional resolution for NADGE, the horizontal rows of antennas were made longer, holding 64 antennas per row on longer 40 feet (12 m) long horizontal arms. These were grouped into four modules of ten rows, for a total of 40 horizontal arms and 2560 individual antennas. The vertical spine was somewhat larger because it now held both the transmitters and receivers, but eliminated the need for the separate transmitter trailer and was somewhat shorter at 24 feet (7.3 m) tall. The number of vertical beams in the beam forming network was reduced from nine to eight, while the S723C model further reduces this to six.

Each individual row had its own transmitter located where the waveguide feed would have been in the S713. Because there was no central transmitter, the transmitter trailer was removed from the convoy and the need to attach it to the spine was eliminated. Additionally, the receiver-side electronics, processing and display systems were all upgraded and now fit into a single ISO container. The result is that the entire system now uses only three trailers in total, the antenna, the operations consoles and the generator.

With greatly reduced peak power of 132 kW, and the mean power roughly halved to 5 kW the pulse length was increased 15 times to 150 μs to increase the amount of energy in the pulses back to about what it was in the S713. On reception, pulse compression reduced this to the same 0.25 μs as the S713. Maximum detection altitude was reduced to about 20º but detection altitude at that angle was increased to about 200,000 ft at 100 nautical miles (190 km; 120 mi). Altitude accuracy was roughly half that of the S713, about 1700 ft at 100 nautical miles (190 km; 120 mi).

=== S743 and S753 ===
S743-D
- Frequency: D-band
- Pulsewidth: 250 μs
- RPM: 5-6 rpm
- Range: 256 nmi (474 km)
- Altitude: 100,000 ft (30,000 m) max
- Azimuth: 1.4°
- Elevation: -2° to 20°

S753
- Frequency: D-band
- RPM: 5 rpm
- Range: up to 216 nmi (400 km)
- Altitude: 100,000 ft (30,000 m) max
- Height: 5.1 m (17 ft)
- Width: 6 m (20 ft)
- Azimuth: 2.8°
- Elevation: 2.8°
- Power: 3.3 kW mean

Continued improvements in solid state electronics, and especially microprocessors, led to the development of the S743, a product-improved S723. The primary change was the selection of a new transmitter module with a wider bandwidth, 130 MHz up from 100, and improved reliability. The signal processing system was also upgraded to a dramatically more powerful system using an array of 4,000 INMOS Transputers. The antenna was slightly modified to have 62 antennas per row, reducing beamwidth slightly from the 723's 1.6º to 1.4º. (Note: Forecast states the beamwidth of the S723 is also 1.4.)

The S753 is a tactical control radar version of the S743 with the explicit goal of reducing setup times. While the S723 required around six hours to set up, the S743 reduced this to four hours (for 10 men), and the S753 to one hour. To aid this, the vertical coverage is reduced by removing one module, leaving 32 elements, reducing the number of antennas per element to 40, and using the smaller beam-forming system with six beams.
