= RRH Buchan =

Royal Air Force air defence radar

RRH Buchan
- Near Boddam, Aberdeenshire in Scotland
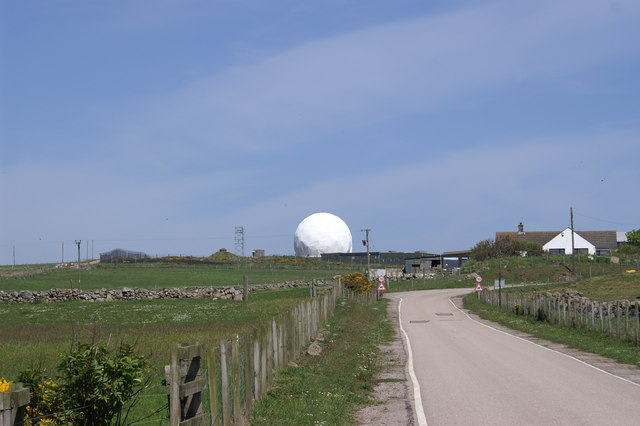
- Radar dome at RRH Buchan.

- Au Courant (French for 'Fully informed' / 'Up-to-date')

Site information
- Type: Remote Radar Head
- Owner: Ministry of Defence
- Operator: Royal Air Force
- Controlled by: Air Command and Control Force
- Condition: Operational
- Radar type: Lockheed Martin AN/TPS-77 (AMES Type 92) Air Defence Radar

Location
- Shown within Aberdeenshire RRH Buchan (the United Kingdom)
- Coordinates: 57°27′30″N 001°48′43″W
- Area: 65 hectares (160 acres)

Site history
- Built: 1952
- In use: 2004 – present

Garrison information
- Occupants: Radar Flight (North)

Remote Radar Head Buchan or RRH Buchan is an air defence radar station operated by the Royal Air Force. It is located at Stirling Hill, 3.2 kilometres (2.0 mi) south of Peterhead on the Aberdeenshire coast of northeast Scotland.

The unit is based at the operations site of the former RAF Buchan which was downgraded from an RAF station to a remote radar head (RRH) in September 2004.

== History ==
=== RAF Buchan ===
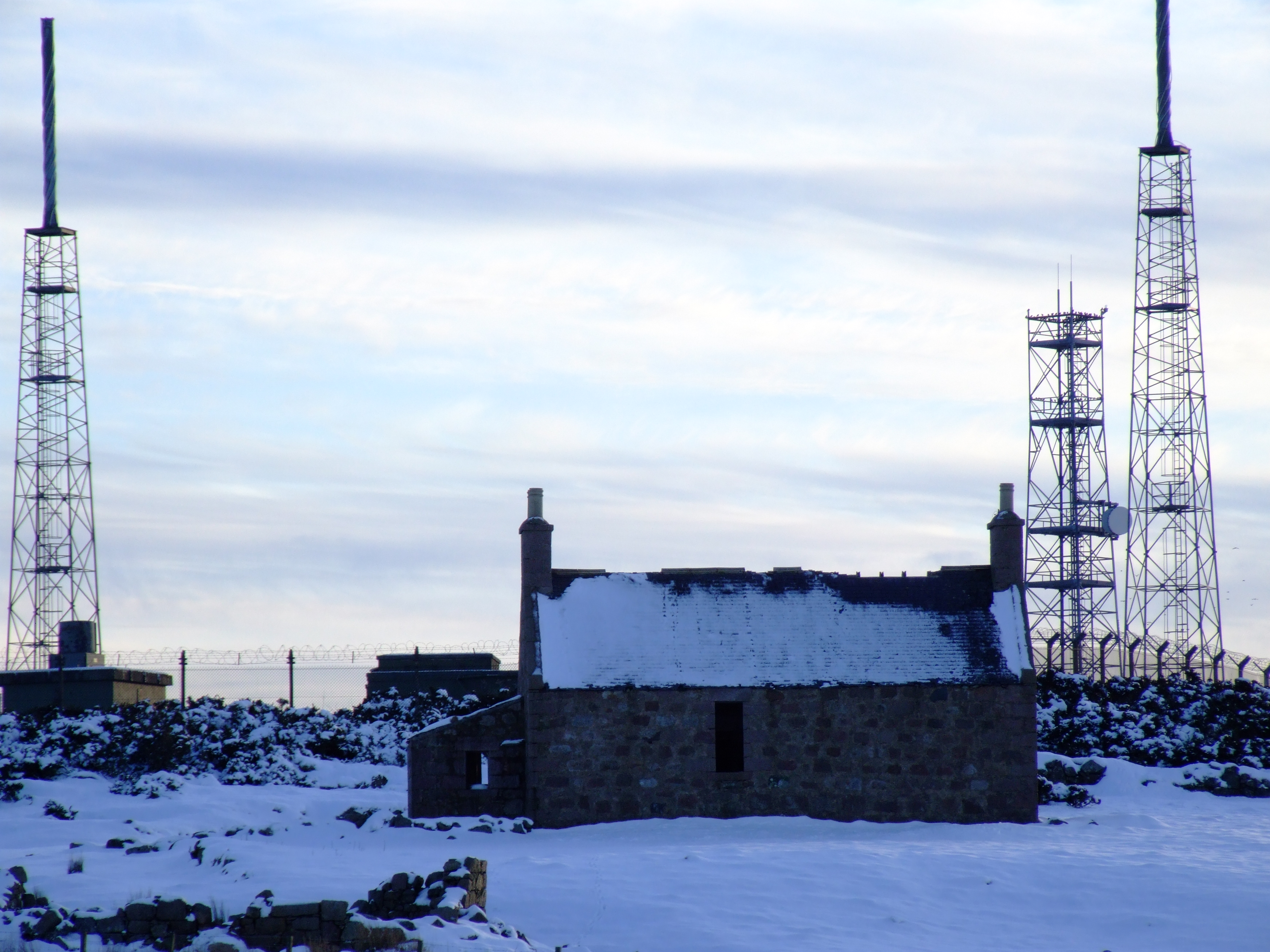
Masts at RRH Buchan.

RAF Buchan opened in 1952 as an Air Defence Radar Unit. As part of the UK Air Surveillance and Control System, the station was one of two Control and Reporting Centres (CRC) which monitored air traffic in and around UK airspace. RAF Buchan was parent station to remote radar heads at Saxa Vord and Benbecula.

In 1979 operations moved into interim facilities above ground whilst the 'R3' underground operations block was refitted as an 'R3A', this involved the excavation of one side of the 'R3' and an auxiliary bunker was constructed alongside to provide secure facilities for stand by generators, power cleaning and air filtration. The equipment used included the GL-161 computer system.

=== Control and Reporting Centre ===
Following the collapse of the Warsaw Pact in 1991, Buchan became a Control and Reporting Centre (CRC), part of the UK Air Surveillance and Control System (UKASACS). Buchan was responsible for UK airspace north of Newcastle, working closely with counterparts in Scandinavian countries. The southern CRC was located at RAF Neatishead in Norfolk. Around the same time, Buchan became parent station for RAF Saxa Vord in Shetland (91 Signals Unit) and RAF Benbecula (71 Signals Unit) in the Outer Hebrides, both of which were downgraded to reporting posts which feed data into the UKASACS.

Together, the two CRCs processed information which was provided continuously by reporting posts and civilian radars, producing an overview of all aircraft operating within UK airspace, known as the Recognised Air Picture (RAP). Information would also be communicated via digital data-links to neighbouring NATO countries, Airborne Early Warning (AEW) & other aircraft, ground units and ships. Fighter controllers at Buchan also provided tactical control of air-defence aircraft during peacetime Quick Reaction Alert (QRA) interceptions, during training and in the event of war.

In 1994 Buchan was home to Nos 170 and 487 Signals Unit and the CRC.

=== RRH Buchan ===
In May 2000 the Ministry of Defence announced the downgrading of RAF Buchan from a manned station to a remote radar head, and that RAF Boulmer in Northumberland and RAF Neatishead in Norfolk, would continue to operate the surveillance and control system. The measure resulted in the loss of 55 civilian jobs and the transfer of over 200 RAF personnel. Around 92 military and civilian personnel were expected to remain to operate the remote radar head. The radar unit ceased to be a RAF station on 1 September 2004 and the operational part of the station became Remote Radar Head Buchan.

The separate domestic accommodation site located in Boddam was sold by the Ministry of Defence to a private developer in 2012.

Buchan's Type T92(B3) radar (more widely known out-with RAF service as the Lockheed Martin AN/FPS-117) was replaced in 2015 with a new Lockheed Martin AN/TPS-77 system. The new radar was funded by wind farm developers and was installed in order to help reduce the impact of interference from wind turbines.

In 2017 the unit's radome was replaced over a six-week period, the existing enclosure having been installed in 1984.

As part of a major upgrade of Remote Radar Head sites around the United Kingdom, the Ministry of Defence began a programme entitled HYDRA in 2020 to install new communications buildings, radar towers and perimeter security.

== Operations ==
RRH Buchan operates a Lockheed Martin AN/TPS-77 long-range surveillance radar. It collects data as part of the UK Air Surveillance And Control System (ASACS) based at RAF Boulmer and supports the creation of the recognised air picture for the United Kingdom.

Radar Flight (North) of the ASACS Engineering & Logistics Squadron based at RAF Boulmer has command and control of RRH Buchan and ensures its operational availability.

As of 1 January 2024, twenty UK Armed Forces Service personnel are based at Buchan.

== See also ==
- Improved United Kingdom Air Defence Ground Environment – UK air defence radar system in the UK between the 1990s and 2000s
- Linesman/Mediator – UK air defence radar system in the UK between the 1960s and 1984
- List of Royal Air Force stations
- NATO Integrated Air Defense System
- Armed forces in Scotland
- Military history of Scotland
