= Air Ministry Experimental Station =

Radar development aspect

AMES, short Air Ministry Experimental Station, was the name given to the British Air Ministry's radar development team at Bawdsey Manor (afterwards RAF Bawdsey) in the immediate pre-World War II era. The team was forced to move on three occasions, changing names as part of these moves, so the AMES name applies only to the period between 1936 and 1939.

Although used as a name by the team itself only briefly, the AMES acronym became the basis for naming Royal Air Force radar systems through the war. The same numbering sequence was used after the war as well, but often dropped the AMES from the name. An example is the Type 80, which was officially AMES Type 80, but often appears without that marque. Many post-war systems were also assigned a rainbow code and are better known by that name.

The AMES numbering scheme was often ad hoc, with some entries simply being other sets operating together. For instance, the Type 21 was simply a Type 13 and Type 14 in a single vehicle convoy. In other cases Types differ only in minor details, like the Type 31 through 34, which are the same radars mounted in various ways. They are also often out-of-order; the Type 8 was the prototype for the Type 7.

== Equipment ==
- AMES Type 1, Chain Home (CH) – Early Warning
- AMES Type 2, Chain Home Low (CHL) – Early Warning, low altitude
- AMES Type 3, Type 1 and Type 2 operating in close proximity
- AMES Type 4, Chain Overseas (CO), also known as Intermediate (ICH)
- AMES Type 5, Chain Overseas Low (COL)
- AMES Type 6, Light Warning Set, short range early warning and tactical control
- AMES Type 7, Final static Ground-controlled interception (GCI) station (Happidrome)
- AMES Type 8, Various marks of GCI radars, mobile and semi-static
- AMES Type 9, Mobile Chain Home
- AMES Type 10, Mobile Air Transportable System
- AMES Type 11, Type 8 adapted to work at 600 MHz in case 1.5 m CHL/GCI was jammed
- AMES Type 12, Low Frequency transportable Chain Home Low.
- AMES Type 13, 10 cm "Nodding" Height Finder. Transmitter and Receiver of Naval Type 277 – Marconi
- AMES Type 14, 10 cm surveillance radar – Marconi
- AMES Type 15, GCI radar, mobile version of Type 7
- AMES Type 16, Fighter Direction Station
- AMES Type 17, Fighter Direction (abandoned)
- AMES Type 18, CHL/GCI Modified Type 11 Mk2 (H) with height finding (abandoned)
- AMES Type 19, GCI Final Standby Type
- AMES Type 20, Decimetric Height Finder
- AMES Type 21, Tactical Control. Five vehicle GCI convoy – Marconi
- AMES Type 22, GCI / COL (similar to AMES Type 11)
- AMES Type 23, LOMAN Overseas LORAN system
- AMES Type 24, Long range 10 cm Height Finder
- AMES Type 25, Experimental CHL
- AMES Type 26, GCI British version of American MEW (Microwave Early Warning)
- AMES Type 27, Air Transportable GCI
- AMES Type 28, CMH Air transportable Height Finder
- AMES Type 29, CHEL (Chain Home Extra Low) Air transportable (abandoned)
- AMES Type 30, CD (Coast Defence) / CHL (Admiralty only)
- AMES Type 31, CHEL CD in wooden hut
- AMES Type 32, CHEL CD – Nissen hut – none built
- AMES Type 33, CHEL CD – brick built
- AMES Type 34, CHEL CD 200 ft tower
- AMES Type 37, CHEL CD
- AMES Type 40, CD/CHL
- AMES Type 41, CHEL
- AMES Type 42, CHEL
- AMES Type 43, CHEL
- AMES Type 44, CHEL
- AMES Type 46, CHEL
- AMES Type 47, CHEL
- AMES Type 48, CHEL
- AMES Type 50, CHEL
- AMES Type 61, AN/TPS-1, medium range microwave tactical control radar
- AMES Type 70, a combination of Type 13, 14 and several other systems organized into a huge convoy of vehicles for mobile large-scale operations. Two such collections put together.
- AMES Type 79, an IFF Mark X interrogator retrofit to some Type 7 stations during ROTOR
- AMES Type 100, 20–80 MHz Transponder-based navigation system – GEE-H
- AMES Type 700, 1.7–2.0 MHz Hyperbolic navigation system – LORAN
- AMES Type 7000, 30–60 MHz Hyperbolic navigation system – GEE ground station
- AMES Type 9000, 200 MHz transponder-based navigation system – Oboe Mk I ground station – Oboe Mk III, S band

== Mobile units ==
Mobile radar units, usually consisting of COL, GCI, or similar equipment, mounted in vehicles, was used extensively overseas, and these units received numerical designations preceded by 'AMES', e.g., AMES 1505 – one of the units providing GCI coverage of the Naples sector during the Allied invasion of Italy.

== Fighter Direction Tenders ==
Three Landing Ship, Tank (LST) were converted into "Fighter Direction Tenders" (FDT), swapping their landing craft for Motor Launches and outfitted with AMES Type 11 and Type 15 fighter control radar to provide GCI coverage for air defence of the D-Day landing areas. Of these ships, FDT 216 was stationed off Omaha and Utah beaches, FDT 217 was allocated Sword, Juno, and Gold beaches. FDT 13 was used for coverage of the overall main shipping channel. In the period 6 to 26 June Allied fighters controlled by the FDTs resulted in the destruction of 52 enemy aircraft by day, and 24 enemy aircraft by night.

== Post-War ==
Post World War II in addition to the AMES Type XX designation new equipment was also allocated a Rainbow Code name during development, e.g., AMES Type 86 was allocated the code name Blue Anchor. In addition, the manufacturing company, Ferranti, had its own internal and marketing name for the equipment, in this case, Firelight.

- AMES Type 79 – version of IFF Mark 10 using separate antennas, used with upgraded AMES Type 7
- AMES Type 80, 2.850/3.050 GHz 1 MW S-Band Early Warning radar – a.k.a. Green Garlic – Decca – high performance system made ROTOR obsolete
- AMES Type 81, version of the Type 80 intended for fighter direction, but never built. Role went to Type 80 Mark III instead.
- AMES Type 82, 3 GHz 3D tactical control radar for Bristol Bloodhound – a.k.a. Orange Yeoman – Marconi
- AMES Type 83, 4 GHz/10 GHz mobile tactical control radar for Bristol Bloodhound 1 – a.k.a. Yellow River, Stingray – BTH, later Marconi
- AMES Type 84, 1.2 GHz 2.5 MW L band surveillance radar, a.k.a. Microwave Early Warning, Blue Label – Marconi
- AMES Type 85, 2.75/3.2 5 GHz, 54 MW – a.k.a. Blue Yeoman, Linesman – AEI, later Marconi. q.v. RX12874 a.k.a. Winkle
- AMES Type 86, 10 GHz mobile CW target illuminator radar for Bristol Bloodhound 2 – a.k.a. Blue Anchor, Firelight – Ferranti
- AMES Type 87, Bloodhound Mk 2 guidance control system a.k.a. Scorpion - some sources claim this was initially applied to the Blue Joker balloon-borne radar, but there is no solid evidence of this and it was cancelled in 1960 before it proceeded to production and would have been assigned a number
- AMES Type 88, 1.3 GHz/3 GHz Tactical Control/Surveillance radar – used in conjunction with AMES Type 89 – pair a.k.a. Green Ginger – Marconi
- AMES Type 89, 3 GHz Tactical Control Height Finder – used in conjunction with AMES Type 88 – pair a.k.a. Green Ginger – Marconi
- AMES Type 90, 1.3 GHz 3MW Early Warning/Fighter Control radar, Marconi Martello S713
- AMES Type 91, 1.3 GHz 132 kW Early Warning/Fighter Control radar – a.k.a., Martello S723
- AMES Type 92, RAF name for Lockheed Martin AN/FPS-117
- AMES Type 93, Plessey AR-320
- AMES Type 94, Plessey AR-3D
- AMES Type 96, Marconi S649, dual-band 3/1.3 GHz 2D long-range early warning radar. Used at RAF Saxa Vord paired with Plessey HF200 height-finders.
- AMES Type 99, Westinghouse AN/TPS-43 captured in Argentina
- AMES Type 101, RAF name for the BAE Commander (formerly Plessy AR327) long-range radar.

== See also ==
- Telecommunications Research Establishment
- Royal Radar Establishment
- Royal Signals and Radar Establishment
- Signals Research and Development Establishment
