= Plessey AR-3D =

British military radar system

- Country of origin: UK
- Manufacturer: Plessey
- Introduced: 1975
- No. built: 23
- Type: 3D radar, early warning
- Frequency: S-band, 2915 to 3055 MHz
- PRF: 250 pps
- Beamwidth: 1º horizontal 3º vertical
- Pulsewidth: 36 μS
- RPM: 6 rpm
- Range: 260 nautical miles (480 km; 300 mi)
- Diameter: 12 by 12 metres (39 by 39 ft)
- Azimuth: 360º
- Precision: 40 m range, 0.16º azimuth
- Power: 1.1 MW
- Other names: AMES Type 94

The AR-3D was a military air traffic control and early warning radar developed by Plessey and first produced in 1975. It used a pencil beam and simple frequency scanning system known as "squint scan" to produce a low-cost 3D radar system that was also relatively mobile. About 23 were produced in total and found sales around the world into the early 1980s.

The frequency scanning system had the disadvantage that a target aircraft would always be "painted" by the same frequency signal, which made the task of jamming the radar simpler. This limited its sales prospects to military users, and shortly after delivering the AR-3D the company began negotiations with the US company ITT-Gilfillan to incorporate their multi-frequency scanning with the AR-3D's receivers and display systems to produce the Plessey AR-320.

== History ==
=== Squint ===
During the installation of the first high-power microwave frequency radars using slot antennas, operators of the AMES Type 14 noticed that the apparent angle of the "blips" on the radar display did not always match the physical angle of the antenna. This was traced to an effect in the waveguides, which had slightly different transmission characteristics based on frequency. When the cavity magnetron warmed and cooled during use, its frequency changed slightly, and a delay was introduced in the waveguide. This caused the signal to no longer exactly match the positioning of the radiators in the antenna, and caused the beam to shift. This effect became known as "squint" and was generally considered annoying, especially on the AMES Type 80 where servicing the magnetron required a lengthy recalibration process to bring the beam back in line with the antenna.

Through the 1960s, significant effort was put into developing "squintless feeds" that avoided this problem, but the problem also presented an opportunity. Squint is caused by the waveguide system slowing the signal by different amounts depending on the frequency. If the signal exits through a slotted waveguide antenna, this slight shift in timing produces a phase shift of the output. This shift will cause the resulting wavefront to change direction. This is the basis of the phased array radar, which normally accomplishes this using signal delay electronics. Squint causes a similar delay and can also be used to steer the beam. This leads to the possibility of radar that can scan its beam in a chosen direction, typically vertically, with no moving parts.

=== SQUIRT ===
Another technique that was being widely explored in the late 1950s and early 1960s was the technique of pulse compression. Pulse compression greatly increases the range resolution of a radar, which was formerly defined almost entirely by its pulse width. To get the required resolution in older designs, pulses were very short, typically a few microseconds, which required massive power output in order to produce a detectable reflected signal. Using pulse compression, the pulses could be much longer, at least ten times, meaning the same return signal would be produced with 1/10 the peak output.

Pulse compression works by changing the frequency of the signal over the time of the pulse and then delaying the returned signal based on its frequency. This compresses the return into a short pulse that can then be used for accurate ranging. This presented a potential issue in a radar using squint scanning, which would presumably send the signals in different directions if pulse compression were used. It appeared that as long as the beam steering was at the right speed it would be possible to do both; a given target would only see a small change in frequency as the beam scanned passed it, but the signal would dwell on any one target long enough that there would be a notable frequency shift during the resulting reflection that could be used for pulse compression.

In 1964, Plessey won a contract to consider the issue and began development of an experimental system. This was completed in 1967 as SQUIRT. Early tests demonstrated the system worked in theory, but the returned signal was weak and the system did not have the desired detection range. The system was modified and testing resumed in 1968 with the result that the detection range had improved but the height finding accuracy was lower than desired. It was finally concluded that the difference in the performance of the system across the 10 MHz bandwidth was too great to be practical.

=== AR-3D ===
Plessey felt the basic concept still offered significant benefits, at least in less-demanding roles, and that it could be greatly improved by increasing the bandwidth past what was possible with its original 1960s-era systems. In 1973 they received Ministry of Defence (MoD) funding to build an example set with a potential 150 MHz bandwidth, which was operational the next year. In 1975, the company put it on the market as the AR-3D, offered for military air traffic control (ATC) and "limited air defense purposes". The ideal market would be day-to-day traffic control around a military airport, where the secondary function of early warning would still be useful. It was displayed publicly at the Paris Air Show in 1975. At the time, they predicted sales of up to 50 systems worldwide.

The system as a whole consisted of the antenna and its mount, six short semi-trailers of equipment, and one full-length semi-trailer with the operations room. It was airmobile via Chinook helicopter. Sales followed with Egypt taking three units, South Africa ten, and Qatar and Ecuador two each. The RAF used one in Germany for ATC around RAF Gatow and sent two to the Falkland Islands in January 1983 followed by another in February 1984. According to Burr, the countries were assigned code names, with Unicorn and Penguin referring to the UK Ministry of Defence, and Rodent, Condor, Lion and Falcon to outside-UK sales. This list shows a total of 23 examples being produced. Those used by the RAF were given the name AMES Type 94.

Newspaper reports from 1986 state another six were sold to Iran, but it is not clear if this is included in the list above or represents new-build systems. Given the late date of the sale, this may be systems "recycled" from RAF use or other sales.

=== AR-320 ===
Although successful in the market, the AR-3D had the significant disadvantage in the military role in that a particular target would always be "painted" by the same frequency signal, and thus jamming the signal would be greatly simplified. Most other 3D radars of the era did not use squint scanning and thus did not suffer from this problem. Seeking a way to apply their work on the AR-3D to a new frequency agile radar, Plessey entered an agreement with ITT-Gilfillan of Los Angeles. Gilfillan also used squint scanning, but did so at different frequencies with each pulse, and thus avoided the problems with the AR-3D. Gilfillan supplied a new antenna and transmitters, while Plessey supplied suitably modified versions of the existing receiver and display systems. The result was the Plessey AR-320, which replaced the AR-3D in the market.

== Description ==
The system was packaged as a complete unit known as the Type 40/80-5 Command and Control Post. This consisted of the antenna unit on a four-legged mounting, a Transmitter Cabin, two Diesel Generators, Communications Cabin, Workshop Cabin and the Processing and Control Cabin. Most of these were in the form of short semi-trailers, although the Processing and Control Cabin was full-length. Although designed primarily to be pulled by prime movers, the system was also airmobile via Chinook helicopter.

The antenna rotated around its vertical axis to scan in azimuth. The reflector took the form of a vertical cylindrical paraboloid, with the lower corners cropped off. The end-fed slot feed antenna was held in front of the reflector by three sets of legs forming triangular supports, one at the top and two at the bottom, the lowest also feeding the signal. The antenna was mounted at one end of its support platform, seemingly unbalanced, while the Transmitter Cabin was positioned at the other where it connected to a waveguide running along the top of the platform.

The transmitter used two stages, the first being a travelling wave tube and the second a grid klystron. Total peak power was 1.1 MW while average power was 10 kW. The transmitter had a bandwidth of 140 MHz during its 36 microseconds pulses.

On reception, the signal was converted to an intermediate frequency and then split into eight signal paths, each of which accepted a range of frequencies in order to perform coarse vertical angle determination. Pulse compression was then added using an acoustic surface wave filter, compressing it to 100 nanoseconds. The lowest elevation "beams" also had moving target indication clutter suppression to eliminate ground returns.

The output of the receivers was then sent to a plot extractor, which identified moving objects in the returns and attempted to automatically assign tracking information - direction and speed. The result was then sent to the multiple displays in the Processing and Control Cabin. The data could also be sent over datalink via the Communications Cabin.
