= Decca HF200 =

Height finder radar first built in 1957

- Country of origin: UK
- Manufacturer: Decca
- Introduced: 1957
- No. built: ~40
- Type: height-finder
- Frequency: S-band
- PRF: 270 pps
- Beamwidth: 3/4º vertical 3º horizontal
- Pulsewidth: 5.5 μS
- Diameter: 35 by 8 ft (10.7 by 2.4 m)
- Azimuth: 360º
- Elevation: -3 to +33º
- Power: 2.5 MW
- Other names: Plessey HF200

The HF200 is a height finder radar designed and first built by Decca Radar in 1957, and continuing sales into the 1970s after the division was purchased by Plessey in 1965. It was one of the company's successful heavy radar projects, winning the contract for many of the ROTOR stations in the UK and additional sales around the world with a total production run of about 40 examples. These served into the 1980s, and in one case, 1993, before 3D radars removed the need for separate height-finders.

== History ==
Decca Heavy Radar won the contract to build the production models of the Green Garlic radar system developed by the Air Ministry's Telecommunications Research Establishment (TRE) in the early 1950s. This was just prior to the TRE's merger with their British Army counterparts to form the unified Radar Research Establishment in 1953. Decca's version of the Green Garlic was given the name AMES Type 80 and was among the most powerful radars of its era; the Mark III versions had a detection range against bomber-sized targets of at least 200 nautical miles (370 km; 230 mi) whilst having enough resolution to directly guide interceptor aircraft from its radar displays.

Key to the success of the Mark III was a new 2.5 MW cavity magnetron developed at Decca. With the completion of development of the Type 80, Decca turned its attention to other roles that might make use of the same electronics. Decca had contacts with the French company SNERI who had developed a radar clutter suppression system. This was considered for inclusion on a number of Decca radars of the era, notably their Decca Hydra military early warning radar. SNERI had also been working on a system to extract height information from a horizon-scanning radar like the Hydra. This generated considerable interest at Decca, but was ultimately proven not to be useful and was not employed.

This left an obvious hole in the UK market for a high-power height-finder with range that matched that of the Type 80, compared to the WWII-era AMES Type 13 which had an effective range perhaps 1/3 of the Type 80. Converting the Type 80 electronics to height-finding was straightforward, the main effort would be the development of a suitable antenna with a very narrow vertical beamwidth that would provide accurate measures of the vertical angle.

Around this time the Ministry of Defence (MoD) reached the same conclusions about their existing height-finders, and began looking for options. Decca decided to risk the development of the system as a private venture. In addition to the UK market, NATO was undertaking its "high performing reporting post" program which would emerge as the NADGE system. Decca ultimately dropped out of NADGE, and their needs were filled by a system from Marconi Electronic Systems. The MoD then took over funding of further development of the Decca unit to replace the Type 13 as well as the General Electric AN/FPS-6 Radar which were being used in some number.

The first example of the HF200 was completed in 1957 and set up behind Decca's development site on Davis Road in Chessington on the outskirts of London. By this time the MoD began working on their new Linesman/Mediator network. Linesman included the new AMES Type 85 radar, a 3D radar that performed height-finding as well as PPI, so the need for HF200 was reduced. But the plans also called for a number of sites in the network that would not receive the Type 85 and retain their Type 80s, and those were to be upgraded with the HF200.

As part of this program, HF200's were eventually installed two-each at RAF Boulmer, RAF Saxa Vord, RAF Staxton Wold and three at RAF Bishops Court and RAF Neatishead. Additional units were sent to the 280 Signals Unit on RAF Cape Gata and Troodos Station in Cyprus and another at RAF Bukit Gombak in Singapore. Foreign sales followed, three to Finland, eight to Sweden, ten to Iran, four to South Africa, one to India and three to Burma. Westinghouse Electric also purchased eight units for the US.

The HF200's generally went out-of-service as newer radars replaced the Type 80s. The last operational example appears to be the unit at Saxa Vord, which was installed beginning in 1977 and became operational in 1979. It remained in service until 1993 when the station's Marconi S649 radar was replaced by the AMES Type 93, a 3D radar.

== Description ==
The system was designed to work with the Type 80 or similar plan-position indicator (PPI) radars; when an operator on the PPI wanted to measure the altitude of a given blip on their screen, they would press a button as the radar swept by the target, sending the angle of the target to a separate height-finder operator. The operator would then accept the angle coordinate and slew the HF200's antenna to that angle. The HF200 would then begin "nodding" up and down to measure the altitude.

The returns were displayed as blips on a HR scope, which displays range along the X-axis and vertical angle along the Y-axis. The operator moved a cursor, or strobe in UK parlance, so it laid under the selected target, which limited the nodding to a small angle on either side of the target. The altitude was measured compared to a curved line that represented the curvature of the Earth, as targets seen at longer distances would be at higher altitudes compared to closer ones due to this curvature.

Once the cursor was properly positioned, the operator pressed another button which calculated the resulting altitude and sent the value back to the original PPI operator, where it appeared on a secondary display beside the primary PPI.

The antenna used the "orange peel" design, generating a beam about 3º wide and 3/4º high. The antenna was nodded and rotated hydraulically. The system was normally mounted on a truncated cone with the radio equipment in the base. A prominent waveguide carried the signal to and from the antenna feedhorn through a rotating joint behind the antenna.
