= RRH Portreath =

Royal Air Force air defence radar in Cornwall, England

RRH Portreath
- Near Portreath, Cornwall in England
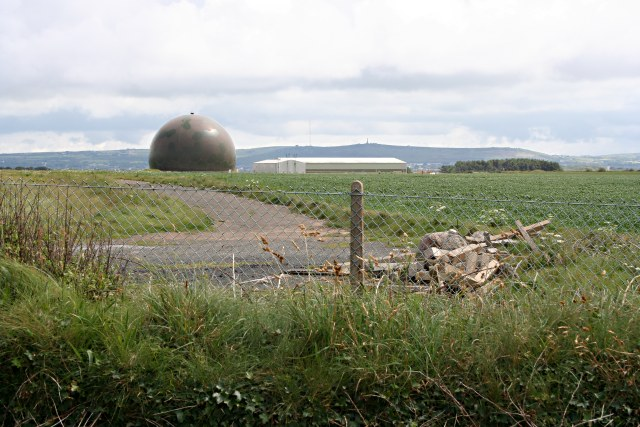
- Radar dome at RRH Portreath

Site information
- Type: Remote Radar Head
- Owner: Ministry of Defence
- Operator: Royal Air Force
- Controlled by: Air Command and Control Force
- Condition: Operational
- Radar type: BAE Systems Type 102 Air Defence Radar

Location
- Shown within Cornwall
- Coordinates: 50°16′17″N 005°15′48″W
- Area: 351 hectares (870 acres)

Site history
- Built: 1940
- In use: 1941–1950 (RAF) c.1950–1980 (Chemical Defence Establishment); 1980 – present (RAF)

Garrison information
- Occupants: Radar Flight (South)

Remote Radar Head Portreath or RRH Portreath is an air defence radar station operated by the Royal Air Force. It has a coastal location at Nancekuke Common, approximately 1.25 kilometres (0.78 mi) north east of the village of Portreath in Cornwall, England.

Its radar (housed in a fibre glass or golf ball protective dome) provides long-range coverage of the south western approaches to the United Kingdom.

== Second World War ==
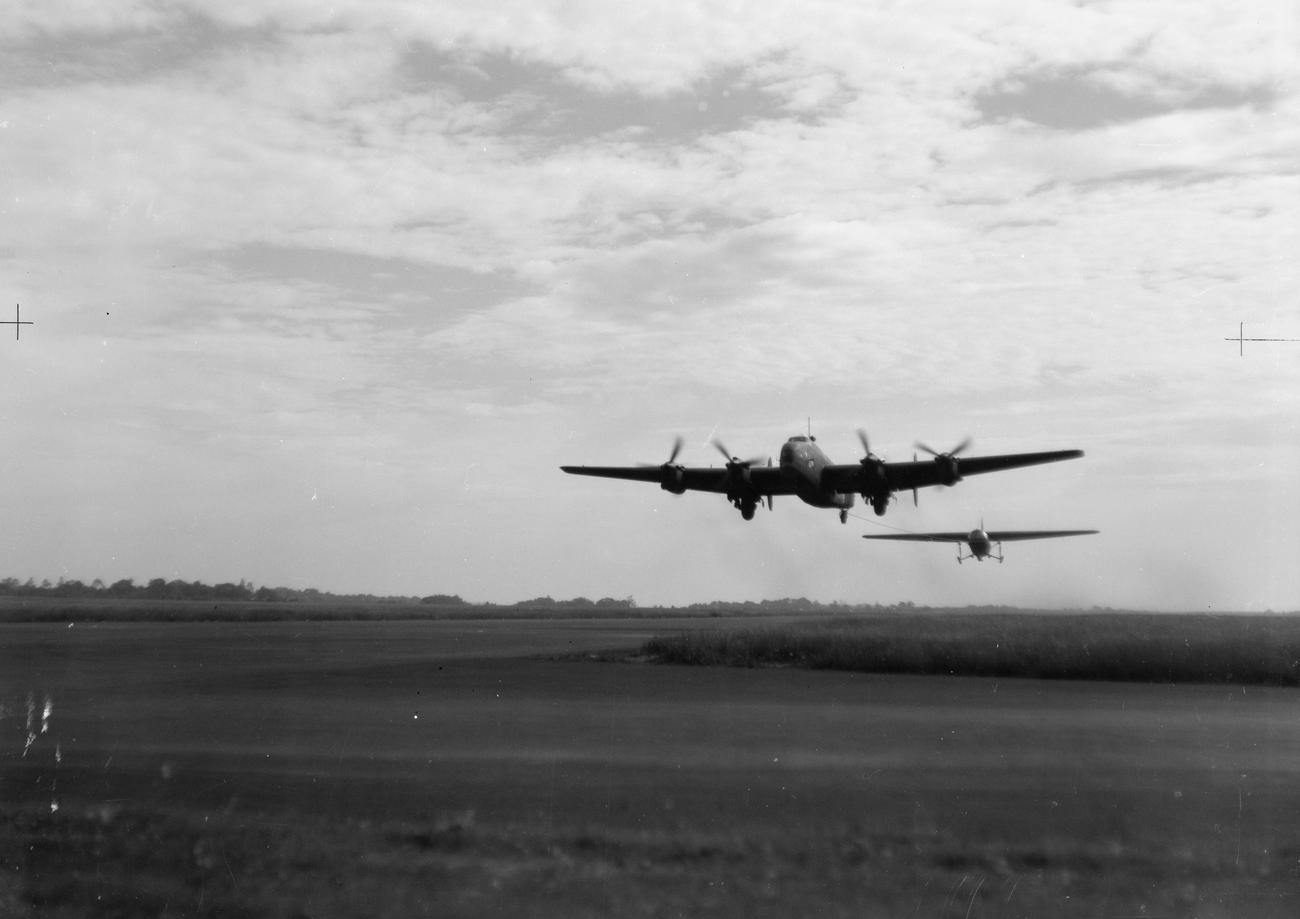
Handley Page Halifax of No. 295 Squadron RAF based at Holmesley South, getting airborne from Portreath, Cornwall, towing Airspeed Horsa glider to Tunisia, during Operation Beggar, 1943

Previously known as RAF Portreath, the station was built during 1940, opened in March 1941 and had a varied career during the Second World War, initially as an RAF Fighter Command station, from October 1941 as a ferry stop-over for aircraft bound to/from North Africa and the Middle East, as a temporary stop-over for United States Army Air Forces and Royal Canadian Air Force units, and then as an RAF Coastal Command station. By the end of the war, it had run down and in May 1950 was handed back to the government by the RAF.

The following squadrons were here at some point:

- No. 66 Squadron RAF (1941/2)
- No. 130 (Punjab) Squadron RAF (1941)
- No. 143 Squadron RAF (1943/4)
- No. 152 (Hyderabad) Squadron RAF (1941)
- No. 153 Squadron RAF (1942)
- No. 234 (Madras Presidency) Squadron RAF (1942)
- No. 235 Squadron RAF (1943/4)
- No. 247 (China-British) Squadron RAF (1941)
- No. 248 Squadron RAF (1941/2 & 1944)
- No. 263 (Fellowship of the Bellows) Squadron RAF (1941 & 1942)
- No. 264 (Madras Presidency) Squadron RAF (1942)
- No. 275 Squadron RAF (1944/5)
- No. 276 Squadron RAF (1941/4)
- No. 277 Squadron RAF (1944/5)
- No. 286 Squadron RAF (1942/4)
- No. 313 (Czechoslovak) Squadron RAF (1941)
- No. 400 Squadron RCAF (1942)
- No. 414 Squadron RCAF (1943)
- No. 613 (City of Manchester) Squadron AAF (1943)
- No. 639 Squadron RAF (1944/5)

Units:

- 'A' Party from No. 131 Airfield Headquarters (Polish) RAF
- 'A' Party from No. 135 Airfield Headquarters RAF
- No. 153 (General Reconnaissance) Wing RAF
- No. 330 (Bomber) Wing RAF
- No. 1487 (Target Towing) Flight RAF became No. 1487 (Fighter) Gunnery Flight RAF
- No. 2735 Squadron RAF Regiment
- No. 2749 Squadron RAF Regiment
- No. 2750 Squadron RAF Regiment
- No. 2758 Squadron RAF Regiment
- No. 2763 Squadron RAF Regiment
- No. 2786 Squadron RAF Regiment
- No. 2796 Squadron RAF Regiment
- No. 2811 Squadron RAF Regiment
- No. 2839 Squadron RAF Regiment
- No. 2883 Squadron RAF Regiment
- No. 2953 Squadron RAF Regiment
- No. 3207 Servicing Commando
- Armament Synthetic Development Unit
- Air Sea Rescue Flight
- Overseas Aircraft Despatch Unit, Kemble and Portreath became No. 1 Overseas Aircraft Despatch Unit RAF

== Chemical weapons centre ==
The base reverted to its local name Nancekuke and became an outstation of Chemical Defence Establishment (CDE) Porton Down. Manufacture of the nerve agent Sarin in a pilot production facility commenced there in the early 1950s, producing about 20 tons of the nerve agent from 1954 until 1956. Nancekuke became an important factory for stockpiling the UK's Chemical Defences during the Cold War. Periodically, small amounts of VX were also produced at Nancekuke. Production of VX agent was intended mainly for laboratory test purposes, but also to validate plant designs and optimise chemical processes for potential mass-production. However, full-scale mass-production of VX agent never took place. In the late 1950s, the chemical weapons production plant at Nancekuke was mothballed, but was maintained through the 1960s and 1970s in a state whereby production of chemical weapons could easily re-commence if required.

In 2000 it was reported that former workers at the Nancekuke base had died as a result of exposure to nerve gas, and the matter was raised in the Houses of Parliament. Works to cleanse the site of toxic materials began in 2003.

== Further uses ==
Many of the CDE buildings were demolished in 1979–1980. From 1978 to 1981, some buildings on the site were used by Pattern Recognition Munitions for small arms ammunition development. The company also constructed a 100-yard firing range for ammunition testing. The RAF re-opened parts of the site as a staffed radar station in October 1980, a Control and Reporting Post (CRP) for UK Air Surveillance. In 1986 an underground CRP was built as part of the new UKADGE (United Kingdom Air Defence and Ground Environment) project. New mobile radar systems manufactured by Marconi Electronic Systems, including an S723 Martello (RAF Type 91), and telecommunication installations were added during the mid-1980s. In the late 1990s, the installation became remote operation, and the primary radar was replaced with the British Aerospace (BAe) Type 101. The radar now in use at Portreath is a Type 102 Air Defence Radar. During May 1995, ceased as an independent RAF station and became a satellite of RAF St Mawgan.

As part of a major upgrade of RRH sites around the U.K. the MOD began a programme titled HYDRA in 2020 to install new state of the art communications buildings, radar towers and bespoke perimeter security.

The surrounding area is occasionally used for rallying. Although data is sent and used by the UK's Control and Reporting centres, Portreath's parent station was RAF St. Mawgan for administration.

== See also ==
- Chemical weapons and the United Kingdom
- Improved United Kingdom Air Defence Ground Environment – UK air defence radar system in the UK between the 1990s and 2000s
- Linesman/Mediator – UK air defence radar system in the UK between the 1960s and 1984
- List of Royal Air Force stations
- NATO Integrated Air Defense System
