= Linesman/Mediator =

British radar network

Linesman/Mediator was a dual-purpose civil and military radar network in the United Kingdom between the 1960s and 1984. The military side (Linesman) was replaced by the Improved United Kingdom Air Defence Ground Environment (IUKADGE), while the civilian side (Mediator) became the modern public-private National Air Traffic Services (NATS).

In the early 1950s, the Royal Air Force was installing a radar network known as ROTOR using war-era radars like Chain Home along with new command centres. Starting in 1954, the AMES Type 80 began replacing all of the ROTOR radars and command centres with a series of nine Master Control Radars and a number of associated secondary radars. While these installations were in progress, in 1953 CSF introduced the carcinotron, which could output a radio signal at any desired frequency. This made it a very effective jamming system, and it appeared to render ground-based radars like Type 80 useless.

Considering several possible solutions, the RAF selected an experimental radar known as Blue Yeoman, later known as the AMES Type 85. This radar changed its frequency with every pulse, making it impossible for carcinotron operators to know what frequency to jam. The RAF initially proposed an extensive network similar to the Type 80s, known as the "1958 Plan". This was abandoned in the aftermath of the 1957 Defence White Paper, which saw the threat to be moving from bombers to ballistic missiles, and argued the system should be cancelled. In late 1958, a much smaller system with only three main radars and a single control centre became "Plan Ahead", with its primary purpose being to provide air cover and anti-jamming support for a new anti-missile BMEWS radar.

During this period, civilian air traffic was increasing dramatically and led to the 1962 formation of the National Air Traffic Control Services organization to handle national-scale air traffic control (ATC). They began a great expansion of civilian radars. Given enemy aircraft might hide among civilian ones, it was seen that combining data from Plan Ahead and the ATC system would have many advantages. Plan Ahead became Linesman and the ATC system Mediator. The systems would share locations in West Drayton (just north of Heathrow) and at Glasgow Prestwick Airport, with a third Mediator site in Preston, Lancashire. Ultimately all three Mediator sites were built, while only "L1" at West Drayton was completed as part of Linesman.

Whilst Mediator proceeded relatively smoothly, construction of Linesman was greatly delayed and it was not fully operational until March 1974. By that time the strategic threat had changed dramatically, and air strikes on the UK once again became a possibility. Linesman's single centralized L1 command centre was vulnerable, and the seaside radars even more so. Money set aside to improve Linesman was redirected to building its replacement, UKADGE. That system was further expanded with Marconi Martello and the Type 85s were stood down in the 1990s.

== History ==
=== ROTOR ===
As the threat of German air attack on the United Kingdom faded in 1944, the wartime network of Chain Home (CH) and AMES Type 7 sites was progressively turned off, a process that accelerated with the end of the war in 1945. At the time, it was believed it would be at least another ten years before there would be another major war, so the Royal Air Force turned its attention to research and development of radar as they felt there was little reason to deploy any systems when better ones would be available by the time they would be needed.

Various events in 1949, notably the Berlin Airlift and the testing of the first Soviet nuclear bomb, led to studies into rapidly re-implementing the air defence system. Most influential was the Cherry Report, which outlined a set of equipment upgrades at existing WWII-era radar sites to improve their performance, along with an entirely new communications network to coordinate the response. Adopted as ROTOR, the new system split the UK's airspace into six "sectors" controlled from underground bunkers, using thousands of miles of telex lines to pass information around.

Deployment of ROTOR would have several phases. The first re-used existing radars and control methods and was to be operational by 1952. The second would replace the Chain Home radars with a new Microwave Early Warning (MEW) set beginning around 1957. More stations would be added and the communications systems updated over time, with the final network being fully implemented by the late 1950s.

=== Master Radar Stations ===
The entire ROTOR plan was upset by an experimental radar known as "Green Garlic" that was developed at the Telecommunications Research Establishment (TRE). This combined an experimental low-noise receiver with a new high-power cavity magnetron and a lash-up antenna. The system more than doubled the effective range for early warning, and when married to a more suitable antenna, provided good detection of bomber-sized aircraft out to 200 miles (320 km). This filled most of the requirements for MEW, but would be available years earlier.

ROTOR plans were initially adjusted to introduce these radars in 1953; they were known in production form as the AMES Type 80. But even as these began to be installed, further upgrades to the design pushed the detection range out even further and greatly increased accuracy. This allowed a single radar to detect the enemy out to the radar horizon, with enough accuracy to direct fighters to the targets and get them within range of the fighters' aircraft interception radars.

With the introduction of these Type 80 Mark III's, the ROTOR plan was obsolete. There was no longer any need to send information to a central plotting room, as the radar operators could do everything directly from their displays. Many of the underground bunkers, recently completed at great expense, were sold off as these Master Radar Stations came online in the late 1950s.

=== Carcinotron ===
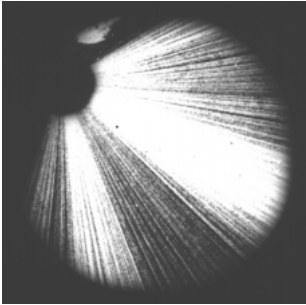
This image shows the effect of four carcinotron-carrying aircraft on a typical 1950s radar. The aircraft are located at roughly the 4 and 5:30 locations. The display is filled with noise any time the antenna's main lobe or sidelobes pass the jammer, rendering the aircraft invisible.

In 1953 the French electronics firm CSF introduced a new type of microwave-generating vacuum tube, later known as the carcinotron. The carcinotron could generate about a kilowatt of output signal, compared to megawatts for the latest examples of the magnetron and newer examples of the klystron. However, it had the ability to be rapidly tuned across a wide bandwidth simply by changing a single input voltage, something the magnetron could not do and the klystron only do within a limited bandwidth.

Previously, jamming a radar was a time-consuming process that required an operator to listen for enemy radars on a receiver, isolate signals from potentially threatening radars, and then set up a transmitter on that frequency. This was effective against radars using magnetrons, which cannot change their operational frequency. Against other types of transmitters, the operator on the ground would notice the jamming and change their frequency, starting the jamming process over again. If several radars could see the aircraft, keeping the jammers properly tuned could be an impossible task.

In contrast, the carcinotron could tune so rapidly that one could simply sweep its output through the bandwidth of any potential enemy broadcasts. As long as this was done quickly enough that every radar would see the jamming signal during the flight time of its pulses, in the order of a few milliseconds, then the signal from the carcinotron would mix with the radar's own and cause false signals to appear on the display. Although the carcinotron's signal was small, it was stronger than that of the high-power radar sources after travelling to the target. The resulting signal was strong enough that it would overwhelm the radar's own signal, filling the radar display with noise and rendering the aircraft invisible.

To test whether such a system would be effective, the RAF purchased a carcinotron from CSF and fitted it to an aircraft christened "Catherine". In tests beginning in late 1954, the jammer proved to be able to render the area around the aircraft unreadable, even when the aircraft was below the radar horizon. In one test, any aircraft 20 miles (32 km) to either side of the jammer was invisible, meaning a single powerful jammer could hide an entire formation of aircraft. As the jammer aircraft approached the radar station, the signal would be picked up in the radar antenna's side lobes, until the entire display was filled with noise and nothing could be tracked anywhere. It appeared that the decade-long effort to provide radar coverage for the UK was rendered useless.

=== Plan Ahead ===
As the nature of the threat of the carcinotron became clear, the Air Ministry began looking for potential solutions. Two concepts emerged.

One was to simply overpower the carcinotron; although it could produce about a kilowatt in total, it would have to spread that signal across all the frequencies being used by the various radars. This meant the amount of energy at any one frequency was limited, and estimated to be about 10 Watt per megahertz of bandwidth. If the receiver accurately filtered the return signal tightly around the broadcast frequency, it might only receive a few watts of jamming. With enough transmitted power, in the order of 10 MW, the signal reflected off a target at 200 miles would be about 11 W, allowing the radar's signal to remain visible.

This solution only worked if the carcinotron was forced to spread its signal over a wide frequency range, and would not work if it could concentrate its signal over a smaller number of frequencies. To ensure this, the radar's signals had to be randomly spread across a wide range. This could not be accomplished with the magnetron, whose output frequency is a function of its physical construction, but was possible using new high-power klystrons. This possibility was developed under the name "Blue Riband", using twelve klystrons that were randomly mixed together to produce an output signal on two widely separated frequencies.

Another possibility was to use the carcinotron's own signal as the tracking source. If a single jammer is sending out a signal, its location can be determined through simple triangulation from two stations by drawing the measured angles on a shared map. But if there is more than one jammer, each station will measure several angles and it is not easy to tell which of the multiple resulting crossing points contains the jammer aircraft.

The introduction of the correlator introduced a way to eliminate this ambiguity. This concept was explored in a system known as "Winkle" that used two widely separated antennas, several correlators, and a computer to calculate the location of the jammer. It was later noted that one of the two antennas could be the Blue Riband, thereby reducing the number of sites that had to be built. Winkle proved able to track the jammer even while it was below the radar horizon, allowing the aircraft to be driven off before it could approach close enough to be effective against Blue Riband.

By 1957, a new network combining these systems was outlined under the name "Ahead". The system would cover the entire British Isles, like ROTOR and the Type 80s before it. Because the new systems had even longer range than the Type 80, the number of stations would be smaller, with the baseline deployment having only five. A number of Type 80s would be retained in the new network purely for early warning, in locations where interceptions would not be taking place and the anti-jamming performance was not needed.

=== Changing threats ===
Prior to this period, the air defence mission in the UK was based on a damage-limitation model which aimed to reduce the amount of damage on the UK while inflicting losses on the enemy that would make follow-up attacks impossible. This sort of concept is best illustrated by the Battle of Britain, where the RAF was able to cause enough damage on the German bomber force that daylight raids had to be abandoned. Even in the post-war era with early nuclear bombs, this basic concept was still the prevailing strategic concept.

The introduction of the hydrogen bomb rendered this concept useless. In this case, a single aircraft escaping interception could cause enormous damage. Estimating the number of bombers that would reach their targets, it appeared any such attack would result in the UK being devastated. In this environment, the only way to protect the UK from destruction was to ensure the attack never occurred, and the only way to do that was to offer a significant deterrent.

By 1954 there were serious concerns being expressed about the usefulness of air defences. If the goal was to deter an attack, all that was required was enough warning to ensure the V bomber force would successfully launch. Directing fighters to their targets and shooting them down with surface to air missiles seemed like a useless gesture if an attack was underway, given that there was no situation where these weapons would seriously change the outcome of the war. By 1956, all pretext of general defence was dropped and the RAF adopted the policy that the only worthwhile mission was early warning and short-term defence of the V bomber bases while they launched, the "protection of the deterrent" mission. This led to a smaller network of only three stations covering the Midlands area, under the new name "Plan Ahead".

Even this mission was ultimately eliminated with the release of the 1957 Defence White Paper. This paper explored the changes to the strategic outlook with the introduction of the ballistic missile. It noted that missiles able to reach the UK from eastern Europe were already available, and by the mid-1960s these would be armed with strategic weapons with enough accuracy to attack the bomber bases. Although a Soviet bomber attack was still possible, especially low-altitude sneak attacks, such attacks would simply portend the arrival of the missiles – there was no credible scenario where the Soviets used only bombers, if they were going to release their strategic weapons, they would use all of them.

If this was the case, there was really no purpose to the air defence beyond the most minimal systems needed for identification. By 1957 even the concept of defending the V bombers was abandoned; if there was credible warning of any sort of attack the bombers had to launch immediately because in all scenarios missiles would be landing shortly. The key requirement was not air defence, but rapid warning of a missile attack. In October 1957 the UK approached the US about deploying a station of the Ballistic Missile Early Warning System (BMEWS) in the UK in a location that would cover attacks on the V bomber bases.

=== New mission ===
With the changes brought about by the White Paper, there appeared to be no need for Plan Ahead. However, air planners soon pointed out a critical problem. If the Soviets equipped an aircraft with a powerful carcinotron, they could fly it well off the shore and jam the relatively limited frequency band of the BMEWS. This would obscure a missile attack, and the V bombers would be forced to launch until the nature of the threat was determined. If the Soviets repeated this trick, the bomber force and its crews would be quickly worn out.

The solution to this problem was to build a much smaller defensive network with enough performance to attack a jammer aircraft while it was still far enough away that the BMEWS would still be operational. This led to a new Ahead layout in 1958 with three stations arranged in a triangle covering the V bomber bases and extending to cover the BMEWS.

Even this limited deployment was heavily criticised within the government, not the least of which by Prime Minister Harold Macmillan himself. He desired to move the UK's own force to missiles as well, at which point the network would be superfluous. Eventually, the plan was approved only if all other air defence radars were cancelled, and accordingly, work on the Blue Joker system ended in 1960.

=== Air traffic control ===
Through the 1950s, the RAF had become accustomed to treating the airspace above 40,000 feet (12 km) as their own to use as they saw fit. At that time, the RAF's fighters and bombers were jet powered and flew at altitudes and speeds that the civilian aircraft, mostly propeller-driven, could not touch.

The introduction of the first jetliners, and their rapid expansion in the late 1950s, had led to a number of close calls between civilian and military traffic. This would only get worse over time. Some sort of system would be needed to cover the high-altitude traffic across the entire UK, and this led to the National Air Traffic Control Service (NATS) under Laurence Sinclair, who were planning an extensive network of their own based on the new Decca DASR-1 and Marconi S264 radars.

Macmillan remained sceptical of Plan Ahead and asked the Chief Scientific Advisor to the Ministry of Aviation, Solly Zuckerman, to consider it. Zuckerman stated there was no way to significantly reduce the estimated cost of the system and still have a military use. However, he suggested one solution would be to use it as the basis for a shared military/civilian air traffic control network and thus share the costs that would otherwise require two complete networks.

A series of follow-up studies by NATS all agreed with Zuckerman, pointing out that a military network would need complete information on civilian flights anyway in order to filter out contacts that were scheduled jetliner traffic. There appeared to be no reason not to merge the networks, and the result would be a network once again covering the entire UK.

Only minor changes were made to the military network. One was to move the location of the inland radar, originally RAF Bramcote, to a new location further north on the eastern shoreline, RAF Boulmer, which was intended to cover the BMEWS location now that it had also moved to its final position at RAF Fylingdales. This meant the original triangular layout was now an extended line, but this had little effect on the overall performance.

The other change was to move the southern-sector control centre from RAF Bawburgh to be beside the new London Area Control Center in West Drayton, which would significantly reduce the cost of the telecommunications equipment. This led to a firestorm of protest within the RAF, because while it was true this would help communications with the civilian network, it made communications with the military radars more difficult, potentially able to be jammed. The argument over this issue raged, but no changes were made in the immediate term.

=== Linesman/Mediator ===
By 1961 any remaining argument was overruled, and on 21 February the Treasury released funding for the newly-christened Linesman/Mediator.

== Implementation ==
Linesman, whilst part of the "Ahead" plan, evolved out of the study into combining radar information carried out in the late 1950s by the Royal Radar Establishment (RRE) at Malvern with the participation of the Automatic Telephone Manufacturing Company (ATE) of Liverpool. The concept was to reduce the complexity of the existing distributed ROTOR system using multiple Master Radar Stations (MRS) with a single site designated "L1" (Linesman 1). L1 would be able to direct all of the air command using a complete air picture of the UK.

During the initial stages of the project RRE became the Royal Signals and Radar Establishment (RSRE) and, in 1962, AT&E merged into Plessey.

Linesman was a comprehensive upgrade of the UK air defence system; along with work on the signalling and communications issues, upgrades to the existing radars were also planned. The existing Type 80 radars used in the MRS network were powerful but relatively easy to jam. Upgrades were aimed primarily at offering improved jamming resistance in the event of a noisy ECM environment. To augment the existing Type 80, development of three new types of radar was planned: two primary long-range search radars, Marconi's Type 84 and the AEI Type 85 "Blue Yeoman", and the Decca HF 200 height-finder. To counter jamming, the two primary radars operated on different frequency bands, the Type 84 in "L" band and the Type 85 in "S" band.

During various reviews of Linesman and the "Ahead" plan it was decided to incorporate civilian air traffic control, the "Mediator" portion of the plan. Linesman and Mediator were now considered jointly, although this led to escalating costs and the subsequent need to scale down the original plan.

Whilst the L1 was originally intended to be underground at Bawburgh, Norfolk, cost-cutting between 1960 and 1962 led to a prototype of the L1 system being set up above-ground in Building 123 at West Drayton in 1963. The Mediator element set up LATCC (London Air Traffic Control Centre) in a building nearby. LATCC used the Linesman data in their Marconi Myriad computers to handle all air traffic control in the London area. Here the main manufacturers (Plessey – data processing, and Marconi – displays) carried out enhanced development. Each of the Linesman sites was able to operate on its own, but the network was intended to be controlled from the centralized "L1" site (now at West Drayton). Each of the field stations sent data to L1 over microwave links, eventually phone lines, where it was recombined to form a country-wide view of the airspace; a Recognized Air Picture (RAP).

The original central computer system for Linesman consisted of 21 Plessey XL4 and XL6 computers, integrated as the Radar Data Processing System (RDPS); unusually for the time, they were made using germanium rather than silicon semiconductors at the insistence of the MOD because it had reliability data only on the former type. These computers worked together using random highways that were a very early version of a local area network. The 21 RDPS computers then worked to assemble the Recognised Air Picture (RAP) which covered an area 1024 by 1024 nautical miles over the British Isles. Three more Ferranti Argus 500 computers were added as the Recognised Air Picture Dissemination System (RAPIDS) which also extended the RAP to 1900 by 1900 nautical miles. Long-range early warning data was also fed through data links to and from NATO and French radar sites. Other parts of the system were never commissioned, including three more computers that would have integrated the processing of filed civilian flight plans, and data links that would have been used to integrate the Bloodhound missile's computer systems as well as a link to Fylingdales. The RDPS was in operation until 1984 when it was scrapped.

== Sites ==
The concept of two main data processing hubs, the L1 and L2, also divided the UK into two areas: the Northern Track Production Area (NTPA) and the Southern Track Production Area (STPA). The L1 primarily looked after the STPA with inputs from four main sites – RAF Neatishead in Norfolk, RAF Staxton Wold in Yorkshire, RAF Boulmer in Northumberland and RAF Bishops Court in Northern Ireland. To this there were also inputs from six civilian radars at Ash, Ventnor, Clee Hill, Burington, London 1 and London 2. It was understood from the start that the L1 site, above ground and made largely of glass, was subject to air attack; as the second "L2" site originally planned to be built underground at Prestwick was never carried out, elements of the air defence system were devolved out to use the standby capabilities of the radar sites, namely the Standby Local Early Warning and Control (SLEWC) systems at RAF Neatishead and RAF Boulmer.

Because the L2 was never implemented, the L1 had to extend its processing to cover the Northern Area as well but, with no computer data links, inputs for RAF Saxa Vord, RAF Benbecula and RAF Buchan had to be voice-told for manual input into the L1 system. Later the L1 also took an input from RAF Portreath in Cornwall. Data from Shackleton AEW aircraft also had to be voice-told into the L1 computer system.

On the output side, the Recognised Air Picture as the General Situation Display (GSD) was fed out as the Higher Formation Display (HFD) to RAF High Wycombe, RAF Bentley Priory and HMS Warrior (Northwood).

As with the ROTOR plan, buildings were given "R" designations, including underground bunkers as well as above-ground technical and operations buildings. There was a serious fire in the R3 bunker at RAF Neatishead where it had to move into temporary buildings above ground for some time. In addition, the R3 at RAF Boulmer was closed down for refurbishment in December 1982 and operations moved to the Boulmer Interim Facility (BIF).

== Equipment ==
The core system principle was to take the input from all sensors and enable 'The Hub Concept' where the system resources were reorganized to provide an air data processing system. This produced an RAP, (Recognised Air Picture) whereby all aircraft and air movements could identified and tracked within the UK air space. Intercepts etc. were undertaken at other sites using the information feeds from L1. It continued in operation until the late 1970s, early 1980s.

The core to the system were the Type 84 & 85 primary radars. Height finding capability was provided by the Type 85 (one of the first 3D radars) and the HF200 Height Finders. As Linesman progressed additional systems were introduced to aid ECCM capability and communications. Each primary radar had an associated secondary radar (IFF), SSR 750, with the smaller secondary radar mounted on the main primary radar aerial.

=== Primary radar T84 ===
The Marconi AMES Type 84 was a primary "L" band radar. The main transmitting equipment was contained in a building over which the aerial was mounted; this building was given the type designation "R17". The transmitter was a magnetron in the single storey building, the signal passing through a rotating joint in the rotating cabin before being fed to the hornstacks on the aerial. The aerial was designed as two 60 foot by 21 foot elliptical parabolic antennas placed back-to-back, one acting as the radar, and the other as an IFF/secondary radar system. In practice the original IFF system was never installed, and instead more modern systems with much smaller antennas were installed on the "front" dish, either below the feed horn, or on top of the main antenna.

The received signals from both the primary and secondary radars were processed at the main technical building for the Linesman site, the R12 building.

=== Primary radar T85 ===
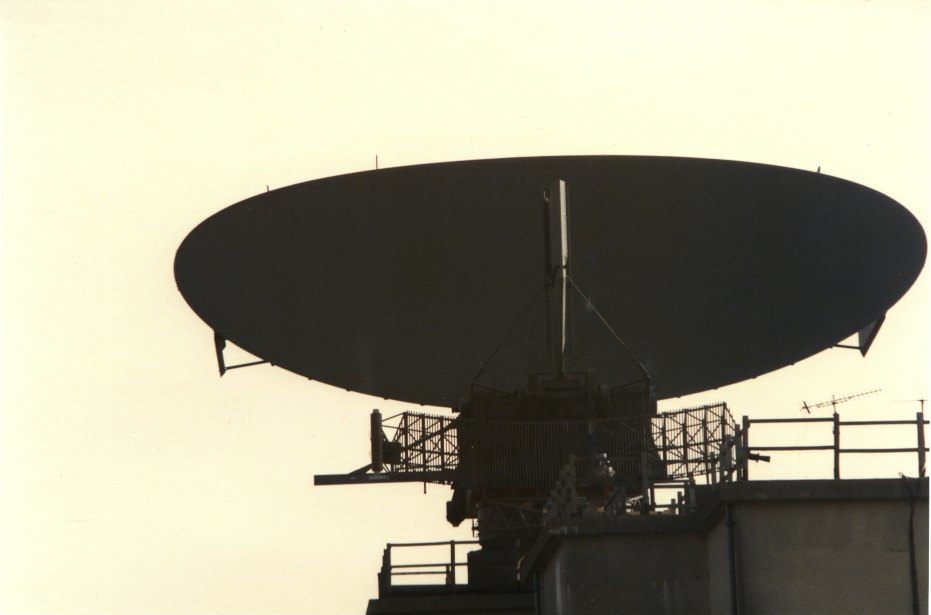
Type 85

The AEI (later Marconi) AMES Type 85 "Blue Yeoman" radar operated in the "S" band part of the spectrum. By comparison with the Type 84 it was massive, a MOPA system with 12 klystron transmitters and 60 receivers. The equipment was housed in the main technical block for the Radar site, the R12 building, the aerial being mounted on top of the building. The Type 85 ended up using the same design of antenna as the T84, although only "one side" of it, the aerial for the associated secondary radar being mounted underneath, rather than above.

The Type 85, however, offered an extremely advanced ECCM system enabling the shifting frequencies on the fly, or as it is now known frequency agility. The radar had 12 transmitters which were grouped in four bands, A, B, D & E. Each transmitter had a peak power output of 5 MW, giving 60 MW total power output, this massive power was routed through waveguide switches that enabled the aerial to produce a standard "cosec squared" beam or, in conditions of intense ECM the power concentrated into a beam 6 degrees high aimed at the target.

As well as the frequency agility and sheer power the Type 85 had multiple receivers enabling the return signals to be detected through the heaviest jamming, this included "dicky fix" receivers to combat carcinotron jamming. Post reception processing, including double integration loops enabling the comparison and discarding of spurious returns enhanced the ECCM capability still further. Whilst not having the Moving Target Indicator (MTI) facility the Type 84 had, the frequency band and processing ensured the Type 85 produced a clear picture even under the most arduous conditions.

As the transmission and reception of the Type 85 was based on 12 beams it was also a 3D radar. Data from the radar was passed to the Automatic Height Finder which compared comparative strength of returns from a target between beams. Given the range and known angle it is a simple process to calculate height. However this was being done hundreds of times a second on multiple targets, in the late 1960s and early 1970s it was a considerable feat.

=== Secondary radar ===
The secondary radar used in the system was the Cossor SSR750. Each primary radar had an associated secondary radar, at RAF Staxton Wold and RAF Neatishead there was an additional "freestanding" SSR. Secondary Radar information was associated with the primary (search) radar and presented on the same display. This gave operators a range of information that far exceeded the traditional, 'range and direction". The secondary radar was a dual military and civil system that worked by interrogating a transponder on board the aircraft, receiving and translating a coded reply.

Decoding SSR signals was carried out at L1 with the decoders supplied by Elliott Automation.

=== Height finding ===
There were three height finding facilities within the Linesman system. One was built into the Type 85 radar, the second was a stand-alone system using the HF200 radar and the third was based on the SSR interrogating the aircraft's systems.

The Type 85 working with the Auto Height Computer Type 12493 enabled an operator to select a target and, by triangulation in the radar's 12 beams, obtain a height.

The HF200 provided another means of finding the height of a target. This radar, rather than continuously rotating, nodded on a bearing selected by the operator. The bearing derived from the main primary radar would enable a reading of the height to be sent back to the operator.

The secondary radar system SSR750 as part of the joint military civil functionality could interrogate a transponder on board as aircraft for the height. This height, automatically derived from the onboard altimeter, was in the late 1960s and early 1970s shown to the operator on a box mounted above his screen. Later, with the advent of plot extraction it could be displayed alongside the aircraft on the traditional Plan position indicator (PPI) display.

=== Passive detection ===
A third system was later added to the network, the RX12874 "Winkle" passive jamming-detection system or PD system. PD consisted of a series of high-speed rotating antennas mounted on R15 buildings separated by many miles, combined with similar signals captured from a Type 85 radar.

The three Type 85 radars located at Neatishead, Staxton Wold, and Boulmer used the associated high speed PD aerials to make a PD baseline. For this the two aerials (T85 and PD) 100 miles apart had to be in sync to ensure they swept the same area of sky at the same time, sync and turning information was sent over microwave link. For example, the Type 85 at Neatishead used the signals captured from the high speed aerial at Staxton Wold to detect jamming aircraft. Each Type 85 with its associated high speed aerial was able to provide a PD baseline of several hundred miles to the north and south. There was a high speed aerial situated at Dundonald Hill in Ayrshire, Scotland which provided a baseline to the north of RAF Boulmer, but there was no similar extension to the south of RAF Neatishead.

The signals were combined at one of the radar stations (at the location of the Type 85 forming one end of the baseline) in a phase correlator that produced a series of possible locations and plotted them as a series of blips on a unique "theta-phi" display. The operators manually adjusted gains in order to reduce the number of blips, and then sent that information to a remote display where it could be combined with normal data from the Type 85. The idea was to locate any specialty-equipped jammer aircraft within a larger attack, allowing them to be prioritized for attack, thereby lowering the ECM load on other radars.

== Operational training ==
Such a complex system required that Operators be fully trained. To this end L1 had a large, digital radar simulator that was capable of generating all the radar inputs of the live system. It was ordered from Elliott Automation following the successful development of the world's first digital radar simulator by that company. Based on the Elliot 502 computer it could simulate 6 radar heads with jamming and noise while displaying over 200 aircraft.

== Operation ==
Linesman, as originally conceived, never became operational. It went operational in the early 1970s but only in producing and disseminating the overall Recognised Air Picture, the General Situation Display and the Higher Formation display until 1984. The interception side was only ever used in the training role of the School of Fighter Control. The L1 got three more computers (Elliott Argus 500s) as the Recognised Air Picture Dissemination System (RAPiDS) and these disseminated the RAP out from the L1 in a more advanced format. Though the concepts remained valid, the technology used to route the radar signals was out-of-date long before the system was completed. Having the control of aircraft centralised in one place also put it at high risk. A change of plan moved the interception roles out to two of the main radar stations, where the RAP from the L1 was used to monitor the airspace while the Fighter Controllers then used the Standby Local Early Warning and Control Systems (SLEWC based on Elliott 920C computers) to control interceptions.

In the original design, processed radar signals were returned from the radar station to L1 and LATCC via microwave links. In the 1960s and 1970s this consisted of processed, but by today's standard raw, video and turning information (i.e. the angle of azimuth of the radar aerial). Received signals from the PD equipment and aerial turning synchronisation information were transmitted over the same links.

In the late 1970s, plot extraction equipment was introduced. This took the primary and associated secondary radar outputs, combined and processed them before sending them over telephone lines to the L1. The RPEARDS (Radar Plot Extraction And Remote Display Equipment) was a hard-wired computer that processed, combined and transmitted the signals. Its memory was magnetic core store that had the capacity of some 1000 words, each of over 60 bits in length, and transmission over the telephone line was at 2400 baud using GMSK.

== Legacy ==
Linesman built on Rotor which had built on Chain Home and the lessons of the Second World War. During the dangerous and tense period that was the Cold War, where the detection and interception of Russian bombers was a weekly, if not daily, event, Linesman enabled the protection and policing of UK air space. IUKADGE and subsequent developments have all built on the legacy of these systems, systems which stem from the Dowding System. An air defence system that enables the quick and accurate deployment of assets to intercept a threat conserves resources and targets them to where they are of the most use.

Conceived, proven and tested in the heat of the Battle of Britain, the system is still sound even if the technology has improved many times and the threat since 9/11 has been significantly altered.

A spin-off from the Linesman/Mediator work at RSRE Malvern was the invention of the touchscreen in 1965. This was carried out by a team led by E.A Johnson, working in H Building at Malvern.

Whilst much of the evidence of Linesman systems and their associated above-ground installations has gone, it is still possible to get a feeling for what operating and working at the height of the Cold War was like at the RAF Air Defence Radar Museum at RAF Neatishead.

== See also ==
- Chain Home Low
- Air Ministry Experimental Station
- Comprehensive Display System
- Type 984 radar
- Marconi Transistorised Automatic Computer (T.A.C.)
