= RRH Neatishead =

Operational radar base of the Royal Air Force in Norfolk, England

RRH Neatishead
- Near Norwich, Norfolk, NR12 8YB in England
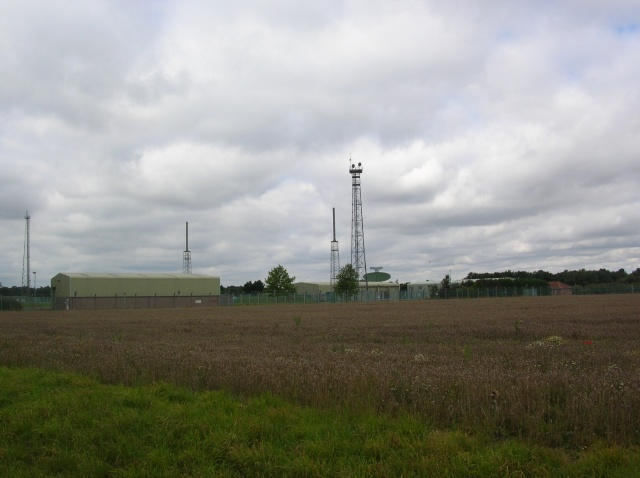
- RRH Neatishead communications masts

- Caelum Tuemur (Latin for 'We Watch over the Sky')

Site information
- Type: Remote Radar Head
- Owner: Ministry of Defence
- Operator: Royal Air Force
- Controlled by: Air Command and Control Force
- Open to the public: No, except for the RAF Air Defence Radar Museum
- Condition: Operational

Location
- Shown within Norfolk
- Coordinates: 52°42′51″N 001°28′15″E
- Area: 11 hectares (27 acres)

Site history
- Built: 1941; 85 years ago
- In use: 1941 – present

Garrison information
- Occupants: Radar Flight (South)

Remote Radar Head Neatishead (/ˈniːtɪshɛd/ NEE-tis-hed), and commonly abbreviated RRH Neatishead, is an air defence radar site operated by the Royal Air Force (RAF). It is located approximately 11 kilometres (6.8 miles) northeast of Norwich in the county of Norfolk, England.

Originally known as Royal Air Force Station Neatishead, or commonly RAF Neatishead, it was established during the Second World War, and consists of the main technical site located at Neatishead, together with a number of remote, and sometimes unmanned sites.

The station motto is Caelum Tuemur, meaning 'We Watch over the Sky'. The station badge depicts the lowered head of a horned bull; and relates to the origins of the word 'Neatishead', meaning 'the vassal's household'.

RAF Neatishead was previously 'parented' (for administrative and support functions) by the nearby RAF Coltishall (a fighter station latterly operating four squadrons of the ground-attack SEPECAT Jaguar). Following the closure of RAF Coltishall in 2006, RRH Neatishead became parented by RAF Marham in West Norfolk.

== History ==
When RAF Neatishead was first established, its primary function was as a 'Control and Reporting Centre' (CRC) for the south of the United Kingdom. Equipment previously located in the base included: Type 7 GCI, AN/FPS-6 height finding radar, Type 80 'Green Garlic' radar, Type 84 radar, Type 85 'Blue Yeoman' radar, 3 Decca (later Plessey) HF200 height finding radars, and a R15 radar.

On 16 February 1966, a fire broke out in the bunker, RAF station fire teams were unsuccessful in putting the fire out and so local civilian fire crews were called. Three civilian firefighters died and the fire burned for nine days before it was fully extinguished. Later that year, LAC Cheeseman was sentenced to seven years for starting the fire and causing the deaths. The station was closed for eight years, re-opening in 1974 after a major rebuild of the bunker complex. The operational nature of the work undertaken at Neatishead was transferred to the previously mothballed site at RAF Bawdsey in 1966, with Bawdsey reverting to a care and maintenance programme when Neatishead came back on line in 1974.

In November 1982, Group Captain Joan Hopkins took command of the station, becoming the first female RAF officer to take command of an operational station.

During July 1990 the Type 85 radar was decommissioned after 23 years of use, it was replaced by the Type 93.

In April 2004, the decision was taken to substantially reduce activities at RAF Neatishead, and by 2006, the base had been downgraded from an RAF station to Remote Radar Head (RRH) status, but its adjacent museum remains open. Its former gate guardian, a F-4 Phantom previously based at RAF Wattisham, was cut up for scrap in 2005 despite interest from the Radar Museum.

In October 2006, local news media reported that a buyer had been found for the now disused section of the base. The 25 1/2 acres site was advertised again in January 2010, with an asking price of £4,000,000. The site was subsequently purchased for an undisclosed amount by Zimbabwean-born British entrepreneur William Sachiti.

== Operations ==
It forms part of the UK's air defences – namely the UK 'Air Surveillance And Control System' (ASACS), and is part of the larger NATO air defence. RRH Neatishead is adjacent to the RAF Air Defence Radar Museum.

RRH Neatishead formerly controlled the remote site of RRH Trimingham with its Lockheed TPS 77 radar.

In July 2022, it was announced that the radar equipment at RAF Trimingham would be moved 8 miles (13 kilometres) to the RRH Neatishead site due to the threat of coastal erosion, and the increased interference experienced by radar operators from the off-shore wind turbines; the move is expected to be completed by the end of 2023.

== See also ==
- Improved United Kingdom Air Defence Ground Environment – UK air defence radar system in the UK between the 1990s and 2000s
- Linesman/Mediator – UK air defence radar system in the UK between the 1960s and 1984
- List of Royal Air Force stations
- NATO Integrated Air Defense System
