= RAF Ash =

Former RAF station in Kent, England

RAF Ash
- Near Sandwich, Kent in England
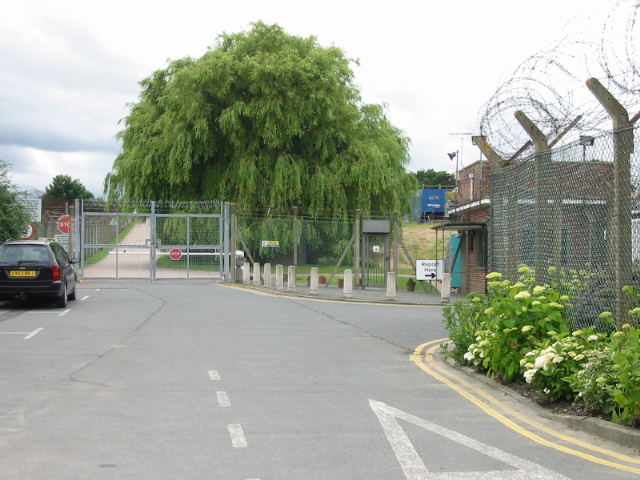
- The entrance to former RAF Ash during 2008

Site information
- Type: RAF Air defence Control & Reporting Centre
- Owner: Ministry of Defence (MOD)
- Operator: Royal Air Force
- Condition: Closed

Location
- Shown within Kent RAF Ash (the United Kingdom)
- Coordinates: 51°16′8.04″N 1°17′40.92″E

Site history
- Built: 1942 – 1943
- In use: 1943–1958 (as RAF Sandwich); 1986 – 1995 (as RAF Ash)
- Fate: Site sold in 1998 for civilian use, bunker now used as a data centre

Royal Air Force Ash or more simply RAF Ash (formerly RAF Sandwich) was a Royal Air Force underground control centre and radar station situated near the village of Woodnesborough, Kent, England.

== History ==
=== RAF Sandwich ===
RAF Sandwich was originally a Ground Controlled Interception (GCI) site situated in Ash Road, Sandwich. However, after the Second World War the area was chosen for one of a chain of ROTOR air defence radar stations and the site was relocated to an underground bunker 1.5 miles to the southwest in Marshborough Road, Ash. The site later closed on 1 October 1958 and was sold on 22 March 1965.

=== RAF Ash ===
In 1980 the site was re-acquired by the RAF for the development of Improved UK Air Defence Ground Environment (IUKADGE) and became operational as RAF Ash on 6 January 1986. It closed as an RAF station in 1995. The Ministry of Defence sold the site on 24 July 1998.

=== Post-closure ===
The site is now used as a secure data centre by The Bunker, an Internet hosting company.
