= Frequency agility =

Radar technology

Frequency agility is the ability of a radar system to quickly shift its operating frequency to account for atmospheric effects, jamming, mutual interference with friendly sources, or to make it more difficult to locate the radar broadcaster through radio direction finding. The term can also be applied to other fields, including lasers or traditional radio transceivers using frequency-division multiplexing, but it remains most closely associated with the radar field and these other roles generally use the more generic term "frequency hopping".

== Description ==
=== Jamming ===
Radar systems generally operate by sending out short pulses of radio energy and then turning off the broadcaster and listening for the returning echoes from various objects. Because efficient signal reception requires careful tuning throughout the electronics in the transceiver, each operating frequency required a dedicated transceiver. Due to the size of the tube-based electronics used to construct the transceivers, early radar systems, like those deployed in World War II, were generally limited to operating on a single frequency. Knowing this operating frequency gives an adversary enormous power to interfere with radar operation or gather further intelligence.

The British used the frequency information about the Würzburg radar gathered in Operation Biting to produce "Window", aluminum foil strips cut to 1/2 the length of the wavelength of the Würzburg radar, rendering it almost useless when tracking planes that dropped the chaff. They also produced jammer units, "Carpet" and "Shivers", that broadcast signals on the Würzburg's frequency, producing confusing displays that were useless for aiming. Post-war calculations estimated these efforts reduced the combat effectiveness of the Würzburg by 75%. These countermeasures forced the Germans to upgrade thousands of units in the field to operate on different frequencies.

Knowing the frequency of the Würzburg also helped the British in their attempts to locate the systems using radio direction finders, allowing aircraft to be routed around the radars, or at least be kept at longer distances from them. It also helped them to find new operating frequencies as they were introduced, by selecting the location of known installations when they disappeared and singling them out for further study.

=== Agile ===
A radar system that can operate on several different frequencies makes these countermeasures more difficult to implement. For instance, if a jammer is developed to operate against a known frequency, changing that frequency in some of the in-field sets will render the jammer ineffective against those units. To counter this, the jammer has to listen on both frequencies, and broadcast on the one that particular radar is using.

To further frustrate these efforts, a radar can rapidly switch between the two frequencies. No matter how quickly the jammer responds, there will be a delay before it can switch and broadcast on the active frequency. During this period of time the aircraft is unmasked, allowing detection. In its ultimate incarnation, each radar pulse is sent out on a different frequency and therefore renders single-frequency jamming almost impossible. In this case the jammers are forced to broadcast on every possible frequency at the same time, greatly reducing its output on any one channel. With a wide selection of possible frequencies, jamming can be rendered completely ineffective.

Additionally, having a wide variety of frequencies makes ELINT much more difficult. If only a certain subset of the possible frequencies are used in normal operation the adversary is denied information on what frequencies might be used in a wartime situation. This was the idea behind the AMES Type 85 radar in the Linesman/Mediator network in the United Kingdom. The Type 85 had twelve klystrons that could be mixed to produce sixty output frequencies, but only four of the klystrons were used in peacetime, in order to deny the Soviet Union any information about what signals would be used during a war.

=== Improving electronics ===
One of the primary reasons that early radars did not use more than one frequency was the size of their tube based electronics. As their size was reduced through improved manufacturing, even early systems were upgraded to offer more frequencies. These, however, were not generally able to be switched on the fly through the electronics itself, but were controlled manually and thus were not really agile in the modern sense.

"Brute force" frequency agility, like the Linesman, was common on large early warning radars but less common on smaller units where the size of klystrons remained a problem. In the 1960s solid state components dramatically decreased the size of the receivers, allowing several solid-state receivers to fit into the space formerly occupied by a single tube-based system. This space could be used for additional broadcasters and offer some agility even on smaller units.

Passive electronically scanned array (PESA) radars, introduced in the 1960s, used a single microwave source and a series of delays to drive a large number of antenna elements (the array) and electronically steer the radar beam by changing the delay times slightly. The development of solid-state microwave amplifiers, JFETs and MESFETs, allowed the single klystron to be replaced by a number of separate amplifiers, each one driving a subset of the array but still producing the same amount of total power. Solid-state amplifiers can operate at a wide range of frequencies, unlike a klystron, so solid-state PESAs offered much greater frequency agility, and were much more resistant to jamming.

The introduction of active electronically scanned arrays (AESAs) further evolved this process. In a PESA the broadcast signal is a single frequency, although that frequency can be easily changed from pulse to pulse. In the AESA, each element is driven at a different frequency (or at least a wide selection of them) even within a single pulse, so there is no high-power signal at any given frequency. The radar unit knows which frequencies were broadcast, and amplifies and combines only those return signals, thereby reconstructing a single powerful echo on reception. An adversary, unaware of which frequencies are active, has no signal to see, making detection on radar warning receivers extremely difficult.

Modern radars like the F-35's AN/APG-81 use thousands of broadcaster/receiver modules, one for each antenna element.

=== Other advantages ===
The reason that several cell phones can be used at the same time in the same location is due to the use of frequency hopping. When the user wishes to place a call, the cell phone uses a negotiation process to find unused frequencies among the many that are available within its operational area. This allows users to join and leave particular cell towers on-the-fly, their frequencies being given up to other users.

Frequency agile radars can offer the same advantages. In the case of several aircraft operating in the same location, the radars can select frequencies that are not being used in order to avoid interference. This is not as simple as the case of a cell phone, however, because ideally the radars would change their operating frequencies with every pulse. The algorithms for selecting a set of frequencies for the next pulse cannot be truly random if one wants to avoid all interference with similar systems, but a less-than-random system is subject to ELINT methods to determine the pattern.

Another reason for adding frequency agility has nothing to do with military use; weather radars often have limited agility to allow them to strongly reflect off rain, or alternately, to see through it. By switching the frequencies back and forth, a composite image of the weather can be built up.

== See also ==
- Variable-frequency oscillator
- Frequency hopping
- Frequency diversity
