= ITT-Gilfillan =

Gilfillan Brothers, later known as ITT-Gilfillan, was an American electronics company located in Los Angeles, best known for their radar systems. They changed names several times, and might be referred to as ITT Corporation Electronic Systems Radar Systems - Gilfillan or ITT Industries, Gilfillan Division, depending on the source. They were spun off by ITT in 2011 to form a division of the newly created Exelis Inc. Exelis was in turn purchased in 2015 by Harris Corporation. Harris merged with L3 Technologies in 2019 to create L3Harris Technologies.

== History ==
In 1912, Sennet Gilfillan took over his uncle's smelting company, which processed precious metals such as platinum and iridium. He was joined by his brother Jay to form Gilfillan Brothers in 1914. During World War I they produced platinum points for automobile ignition systems and branched out to aircraft parts. In the 1920s they began making radio receivers and were best known for their Bakelite radios based on the Neutrodyne system. The introduction of the superheterodyne rendered the Neutrodyne obsolete, and in 1932 the company bought the Willard Radio Company, who had a line of "superhet" radios.

During World War II, the company produced ground-controlled approach radar sets, and the Project Alberta pressure gauges. In 1942, the company was selected to build the precision approach radar (PAR) systems that had been developed at the MIT Radiation Laboratory. These were installed at Royal Air Force airfields beginning in 1944 and became must-have equipment for bombers returning from missions over Germany. Before the end of the war they also introduced the first dedicated airport surveillance radar, which provided clear images of the large amounts of air traffic immediately around an airport. These successes launched the company into the radar market, where they focused their future development.

In the post-war era they began expanding their product line, initially with new ATC systems. During this period they changed their name to Gilfillan Radar Development and Manufacturing Company. The company was purchased by ITT in 1964. By the 1970s they were a leading manufacturer of mid-range systems in the US. Among their better-known lines from this period is the ITT-Gilfillan S320 radar, used as the basis for many US military radars; the PAR-2000 and GCA-2000 air traffic radars; the MPN-26 mobile PAR; and, a range of airport surveillance radars.
