= AN/FPS-19 =

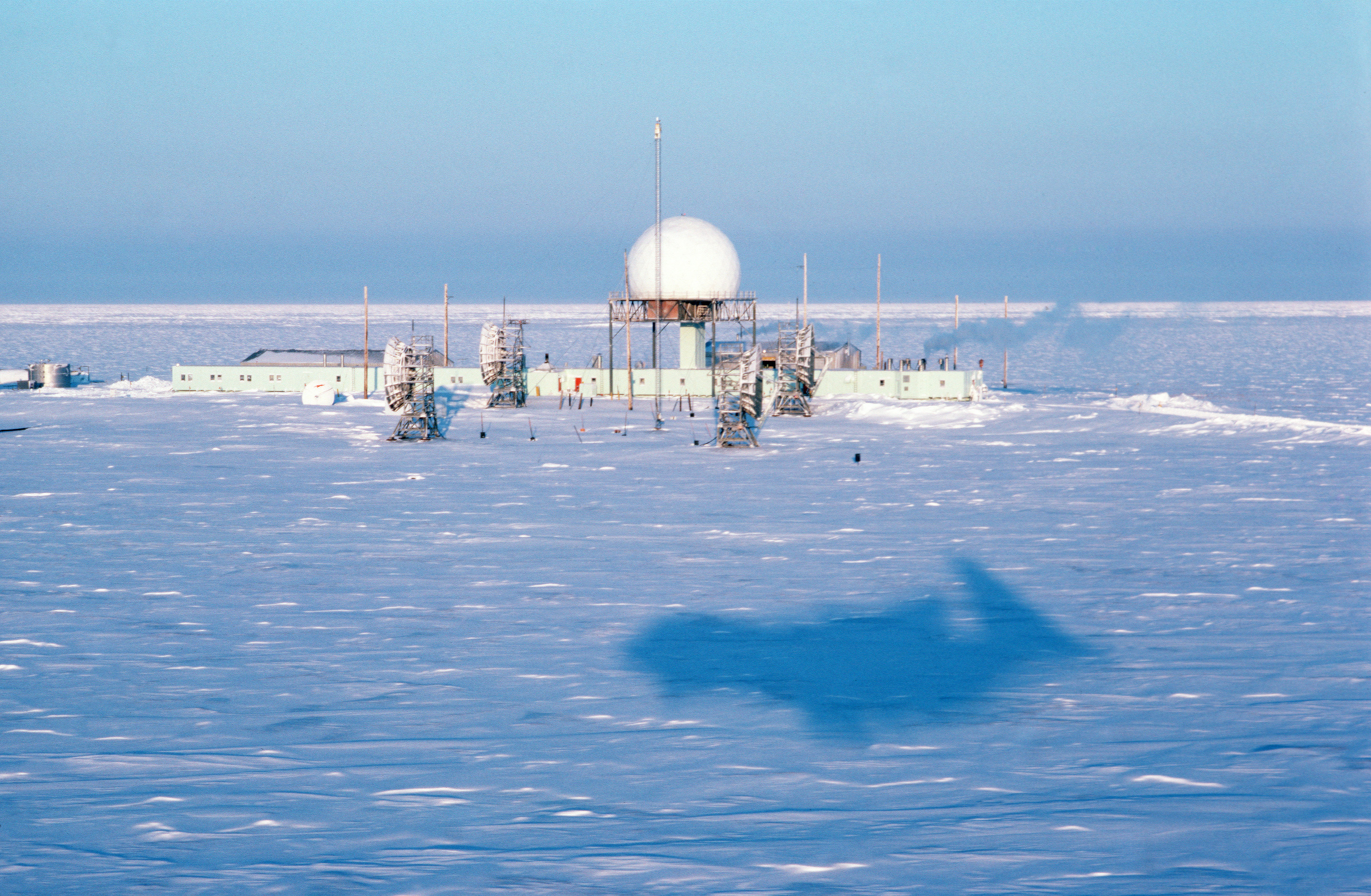
- The FPS-19's radome dominates this image of the POW-2 DEW station.
- Country of origin: US
- Manufacturer: Raytheon
- Introduced: 1953
- No. built: ~35
- Type: early warning
- Frequency: L-band, 1220 to 1350 MHz
- PRF: 400 pps
- Pulsewidth: 6 μs
- Range: 160 mi (260 km)
- Diameter: 75 ft (23 m)
- Azimuth: 360º
- Power: 500 kW x 2

The AN/FPS-19 was a long-range search radar developed for the NORAD Distant Early Warning Line (DEW Line) by Raytheon. It was an L-band system working between 1220 and 1350 MHz produced by a 500 kW magnetron. Two such systems were placed back-to-back, one with an antenna that produced a narrow beam to improve range for long-range detection, and the second with a wider fan-shaped beam to cover higher angles at shorter ranges. The former could detect bomber-sized targets to about 160 miles (260 km) and the latter covered up to 65,000 ft (20,000 m) altitude.

The system was developed from the AN/TPS-1, which dated to the late World War II era. Raytheon adapted it to the long-range role by designing much larger antenna systems and other modifications. The first examples were activated in 1957, along with the AN/FPS-23 radars that provided low-altitude coverage between the stations. The AN/FPS-23 was removed in 1963, and the FPS-19 was scheduled to be replaced by the somewhat more powerful AN/FPS-30. The declining role of bomber defense in the era of the intercontinental ballistic missile (ICBM) meant these upgrades were not carried out. The FPS-19 remained in service until the late 1980s when they were replaced by the AN/FPS-117 as part of the newly named North Warning System.

The UK equivalent was the AMES Type 80, a significantly more powerful radar that formed the basis of their post-ROTOR network.

In accordance with the Joint Electronics Type Designation System (JETDS), the "AN/FPS-18" designation represents the 18th design of an Army-Navy electronic device for fixed ground search radar.

== See also ==
- List of radars
- List of military electronics of the United States
