= AMES Type 84 =

Cold War-era British early warning radar

- Country of origin: UK
- Manufacturer: Marconi
- Introduced: 1962
- No. built: 5
- Type: Early warning
- Frequency: 1.2 GHz (23 cm, L-band)
- PRF: 250 pps
- Beamwidth: 2°
- Pulsewidth: 10 μs
- RPM: 4 rpm
- Range: 250 nmi (460 km)
- Diameter: 60 by 25 ft (18.3 by 7.6 m)
- Azimuth: 360°
- Power: 2.5 MW
- Other Names: Microwave Early Warning; MEW; Blue Label (Note: The rainbow code "Blue Label" appears in only one reference and cannot be confirmed.)
- Related: AMES Type 85, RX12874

The AMES Type 84, also known as the Microwave Early Warning or MEW, was a 23 cm wavelength early warning radar used by the Royal Air Force (RAF) as part of the Linesman/Mediator radar network. Operating in the L-band gave it improved performance in rain and hail, where the primary AMES Type 85 radar's performance dropped off. It operated beside the Type 85 and RX12874 in Linesman, and moved to the UKADGE system in the 1980s before being replaced during UKADGE upgrades in the early 1990s.

The Type 84 had a decade-long development period that saw the system being repeatedly redesigned. It was first conceived in 1951 during the ROTOR program as a megawatt-powered S-band system that would replace the WWII-era Chain Home radars for early warning. But an experimental system developed at the Royal Radar Establishment (RRE) offered similar performance and would be available long before the MEW's 1957 target date. Put into operation as the AMES Type 80 in 1953, the immediate need for MEW was eliminated. MEW was then assigned a lower priority and handed off to Marconi for further development.

A new concept emerged as an L-band counterpart to the Type 80, adding an advanced moving target indication (MTI) system. In this form, the system was ordered into production as the Type 84 in July 1957. That same month, concerns about the new carcinotron jammer grew. MEW was repositioned as an anti-jamming radar using a powerful 10 MW klystron, but this system failed to work. A 5 MW wide-band magnetron replaced the klystron, but this required a new MTI and antenna system as well. By the time these were ready the magnetron was not, and it finally settled on a 2.5 MW version, compromising its capability as an anti-jamming system.

During development, MEW was the primary radar of the Stage 2 ROTOR plans and was intended to hand-off targets to the Blue Envoy long-range missile. But the RRE once again trumped the Type 84 with their new Blue Yeoman design, which was much more powerful and offered frequency agility. Deployment of Type 84 went ahead anyway, largely because it was complete and offered a number of complimentary features. The first operational Type 84 was handed over to the RAF at RAF Bawdsey in October 1962. Three additional units came online during the 1960s, and the fifth from the original order was instead sent to Cyprus and placed on Mount Olympus. The last unit shut down in 1994.

== History ==
=== Origins in ROTOR ===
In the early 1950s the threat of nuclear attack by the Soviet Union led the UK to design an extensive radar network known as ROTOR. ROTOR initially envisioned two stages, the first using upgraded World War II radars like Chain Home, and then, from 1957, these would be replaced by a dramatically more powerful radar known as the Microwave Early Warning set, or MEW. The goal for the MEW was to detect a bomber at 200 nautical miles (370 km; 230 mi).

In 1951 the Telecommunications Research Establishment (TRE) began experimenting with new low-noise crystal detectors that improved reception by 10 dB, and new cavity magnetrons of roughly 1 MW power. Combining these together on a lashed-up antenna system from the war-era AMES Type 14 produced a test unit known as "Green Garlic". Although somewhat shorter-ranged than MEW, all that was required to complete development was a new antenna and its physical mounting system. It filled most of the MEW requirements but would be available years earlier.

=== New concept ===
As these AMES Type 80s went into service, there was some debate what to do with the MEW. During this period the TRE had also been experimenting with moving target indication (MTI) systems on an AMES Type 11 radar. These systems removed non-moving returns from the radar display, which is extremely useful for eliminating reflections off of local terrain which otherwise leaves large areas on the display where aircraft cannot be seen. This led to the idea that MEW would be an L-band counterpart to Type 80 with a good MTI system. MEW development was spun off to Marconi Wireless.

An additional desire was to have the system provide height finding as well, which would eliminate the separate radars that would be needed for that role. As early as 1954, Marconi had demonstrated that the height finding function in the L-band was impractical. A new specification emerged returning MEW to a MTI-equipped Type 80, using the same antenna system.

=== MTI development ===
MTI is accomplished by comparing an incoming signal from the current radar pulse with the last one sent, and looking for changes in frequency due to the Doppler shift. This requires the last pulse to be stored so it can be compared with the current one, which is difficult to do at microwave frequencies. The simplest solution is to use a much lower intermediate frequency (IF) as the basis for the pulse and then electronically multiply its frequency before sending, dividing it again on reception for storage. This requires the IF to be extremely stable, which makes it difficult to accomplish with a magnetron as these devices output a slightly different signal, in both frequency and phase, with every pulse. To make this work, the MEW had to use a klystron, which is much more stable pulse to pulse. Based on the goal of outperforming the Type 80, the new MEW plans called for a 10 MW klystron.

Development took place at Marconi's radar center on Bushy Hill, northeast of London. The MTI system progressed well, delivering a system that not only eliminated any non-moving objects, but also had a feature that could be controlled to offset movement due to wind, which was particularly useful for eliminating the images of heavy rain or the use of chaff. The system allowed the operator to select three rectangular areas on the screen and dial in a windspeed and direction for each one.

Unfortunately, development of the high-power klystron did not progress nearly as well. By 1957 the best example available had demonstrated 10 MW when sent into a dummy load, but when attached to a Type 80 antenna this dropped to a maximum of only 7 MW, and that was only on occasion. The problem was due to significant losses in the waveguide. Extensive efforts were made to improve both the klystron and the waveguide, but in 1958 the decision was made to abandon the klystron.

In place of the klystron, Marconi suggested using an existing magnetron that had proven itself in operation on their test rig at Bushy Hill in use since 1956. This system had been used during air exercises in 1956's Exercise Stronghold, where it demonstrated its ability to track in rain, but did have problems with the display of "angels". The magnetron produced only 2 MW, significantly less than desired, but there did appear to be some development potential. To make MTI work with a magnetron, which does not use an intermediate frequency and is not stable, an emerging technique known as COHO was applied. This taps off a small amount of signal from the magnetron as it sends the pulse and uses that as its reference instead of an external IF.

In July 1957, the Air Staff placed an order for four MEWs, which were given the official Type 84 name at that point. Three of these were to be used within a reduced Type 80 network, and another was for use at RAF Akrotiri on Cyprus.

=== Carcinotron ===
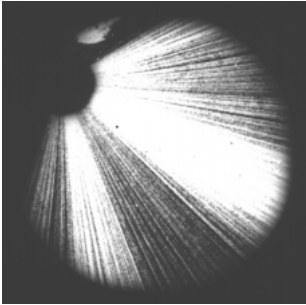
This image shows the effect of four carcinotron-carrying aircraft on a Type 80-type radar. The aircraft are located at roughly the 4 and 5:30 locations. The display is filled with noise any time the antenna's main lobe or sidelobes pass the jammer, rendering the aircraft invisible.

In 1950, engineers at the French company CSF (now part of Thales Group) introduced the carcinotron, a microwave-producing vacuum tube that could be rapidly tuned across a wide range of frequencies by changing the input voltage. By continually sweeping through the frequencies of known radars, it would overpower the radar's own reflections, and blind them. Its extremely wide bandwidth meant that a single carcinotron could be used to send jamming signals against any radar it was likely to meet, and the rapid tuning meant it could do so against multiple radars at the same time, or rapidly sweep through all potential frequencies to produce barrage jamming.

The carcinotron was revealed publicly in November 1953. The Admiralty Signals and Radar Establishment purchased one and fit it to a Handley Page Hastings named Catherine, testing it against the latest Type 80 late that year. As they feared, it rendered the radar display completely unreadable, filled with noise that hid any real targets. Useful jamming was accomplished even when the aircraft was under the radar horizon, in which case other aircraft had to be 20 miles (32 km) to the sides before they were visible outside the jamming signal. The jammer was so effective that it appeared to render long-range radar useless.

These developments were not made known to the Air Staff until July 1957, and it immediately threw their entire "1958 Plan" into disarray. They arranged their own tests and found that the RRE's previous tests against the Type 80 and AMES Type 82 were precisely as bad as the RRE indicated. The L-band Type 84 was even more easily jammed then the S-band Type 80, which was itself considered useless in the face of this threat. Lacking any solution, no further work on the Plan was carried out, with no meetings by the planning committee at all between December 1957 and December 1958.

=== Plan Ahead ===
The RRE had been investigating the problems due to jamming starting in 1955 and presented their first concept the next year. This demanded an extremely high-power radar sent out of a huge parabolic antenna. The idea was to focus as much energy as possible on the target so the radar signal would simply overwhelm any practical jammer, while at the same time reducing side lobes as much as possible to eliminate spurious signals from the jammer reaching the receiver.

Known as Blue Riband, the system required four antennas arranged in a square running on a turntable built on top of a modified railroad bed. This system would have made it among the most powerful radars ever built, and a convincing answer to the carcinotron problem. Additionally, the massive power output gave it formidable range, meaning a reduced network of stations could provide the same coverage as the dozens of Type 80's in service, which would reduce manpower requirements. In 1958, a new network emerged with five Blue Riband stations with a few additional Type 80s and Type 84s kept on the flanks for additional coverage.

This new plan ran directly into the 1957 Defence White Paper. This paper noted the emergence of the guided missile would have two significant effects on the strategic outlook. One was that attacks by enemy bombers could be fended off by surface-to-air missiles, which had already been earmarked as the primary anti-aircraft weapon of the future in the form of Blue Envoy. The other was that the emergence of the medium range ballistic missile would replace those bombers in the strategic role as early as 1965, at which point any air defense, including Blue Envoy, was useless.

Examining these concerns, the Air Ministry returned a further reduced system known as Plan Ahead. This used only three primary radars based on greatly reduced versions of the Blue Riband known as Blue Yeoman, and a much smaller flanking network. Data from all of these radars would be sent to a centralized control center where a single view of the airspace would be constructed. In this system, the purpose of Type 84 was somewhat diluted, with its main advantage being that the MTI system would allow it to examine areas close to the radar, where the Type 85 would be blinded by local returns. This would have the advantage of allowing it to track interceptors taking off from nearby airfields.

The use of missiles in the strategic role, and how rapidly they would arrive, produced a furious debate through the Air Ministry and Whitehall. Matters finally came to a head in 1959, when Prime Minister Harold Macmillan delivered an either-or choice; if the Air Ministry remained adamant in deploying Plan Ahead, they could but only at the price of ending all other air-defense projects. Blue Envoy, the Operational Requirement F.155 interceptor, Blue Joker radar and many other projects were cancelled.

=== Further changes ===
During the second half of 1958, the Type 84's role in the new network was examined, leading to yet another series of significant changes.

The basic idea behind Blue Yeoman was to spread the selection of frequencies used by the radar in order to force the jammer to spread out its signal as well. Calculations showed that a carcinotron might be able to produce 10 W of signal at any one frequency if it was forced to broadcast over a bandwidth about 1/8 of the radar's operational frequency. For the S-band Blue Yeoman's base frequency of 3,000 MHz, that meant it had to use a bandwidth of about 500 MHz in order to force the jammer to dilute its signal below what the radar's own return might produce.

In contrast, the L-band Type 84's base frequency was 1,200 MHz, so to produce the same 1/8 spread, it needed to cover about 150 MHz. Normally a magnetron uses a single base frequency, but some "wobble" is evident. But Blue Yeoman also relied on very high power levels; it was only high power in combination with bandwidth that made the system effective. Accordingly, a new 5 MW magnetron was ordered. There was some hope that enemy jammers might not operate against the L-band at all.

The Type 80 antenna being used for the Type 84 had a mesh surface that was tuned to the frequency of the radar and had an effective bandwidth of about 50 MHz, so a new antenna would be needed. The decision was made to use the antenna being developed for the Blue Yeoman, a 60 by 21.75 feet (18.29 by 6.63 m) solid-surface design with no effective bandwidth limitation. With the Type 85, the signal was being fed from a dozen klystrons spread out vertically along the face of the reflector, so to get this to work with the single magnetron in the Type 84, a system of splitters was added to separate the single signal into eight separate feed horns. The original turning gear from the Type 80 would be retained.

During 1959, wind tunnel tests on the new antenna design running on Type 80 turning gear showed that when the antenna was perpendicular to the wind, the lift created by its curved rear surface caused it to pull itself off the mount. The simplest solution was to mount a second "dish" on the back of the first, thereby evening out the lift forces. After some consideration, it was decided that this second dish would be used as an IFF Mark X receiver, which also operated in the L-band. This would allow a single unit to produce maps of target echos as well as highly accurate positions of the friendly interceptors. Ultimately, this system was never used; there was doubt that enough interrogation pulses would be received in the very narrow beam to be useful. In production systems, a conventional IFF antenna was placed on top of the antenna, facing the same direction as the Type 84.

=== Deployment ===
In 1960 it was clear that getting funding for Plan Ahead was going to be difficult, and that even if it was funded, the initial system would be all that would ever be built. Given this, the base arrangement was changed to move the inland site to the coast at RAF Bramcote, which would reduce the coverage over the Midlands, but improve the system's early warning capabilities over the North Sea. Three of the Type 84s would be placed at the main Plan Ahead bases, Bramcote, RAF Staxton Wold and RAF Neatishead, while two additional Type 84s would be installed at RAF Saxa Vord and RAF Buchan. The Type 84 at Saxa Vord was later dropped, while the test installation at Bawdsey was earmarked for RAF Bishops Court in Northern Ireland, closing the "back door" approach, and the Buchan example moved to Cyprus.

Even this limited version of the network was subject to continual agitation from the cabinet, and in 1962 the Air Ministry asked for yet another study on the layout, wondering if the Type 85s might be abandoned in favour of a system with only three stations in total, all using Type 84. At a meeting in March 1962, it was decided that it was all or nothing - the smaller or simplified deployments were simply not worth building at all. Concurrently, other groups were studying whether the military early warning and tracking needs could be combined with civilian air traffic control systems. Several reports all suggested this was both possible and highly desirable, and Plan Ahead became Linesman/Mediator. The system was given the final go-ahead on 24 October 1962.

Meanwhile, the new 5 MW magnetron (Note: 6 MW in VMARS.) had failed to mature, and the system went into production with a slightly upgraded version of the original 2 MW, operating at 2.5 MW. In this form, the final Type 84 emerged after a decade of changes. Plans called for the first system to be installed at RAF Bawdsey in early 1960 and handed over operationally in 1961. This was ultimately late; the system was handed over on 2 October 1962. This demonstrated problems against an English Electric Canberra when flying at low altitudes directly at the station, although this had been expected. This led to calls for improved low-level performance, which was delivered by redesigning the feed network for the second Type 84 that was being installed at Neatishead, which entered service in October 1963. The remaining two units followed over the next few months.

It had been planned that the Bawdsey install would move to Bishops Court after the nearby Neatishead installation was complete, initially expected to move in early 1965. Although the program was somewhat delayed, preparations for the move were being made when, on 16 February 1966, LAC Cheeseman started a fire that burned out the entire bunker complex and resulted in the deaths of three local firemen who had been called in an attempt to get the fire under control. The Type 84 finally moved in 1970, completing testing in 1972. The Type 80 serving this location, at nearby Killard Point, was kept operational as well.

The Type 84 entered service only slightly delayed, and the Type 85 was completed by 1968, both of which were considered a success. The same was not true for the data handling portion of the Linesman system, which faced repeated delays and only entered minimal operation on 18 December 1973. It was officially handed over to Strike Command on 1 February 1974 and declared in-service on 31 March. By that time it was already considered obsolete; some of the smaller supplier companies were no longer in the computer business and the germanium transistors used in the Plessy computers were no longer produced. Even its programmers suggested none of it actually worked, and the RAF itself finally reported that it was "so obsolete, it could not cope with any air threat".

=== UKADGE ===
When Linesman was first being considered the belief was that any war in Europe would be nuclear, and that any air attack on England would be as well. In this environment, there was no point trying to harden command centres, they would be destroyed if attacked. This led to the main control center, L1, being moved to an aboveground office building near Heathrow Airport. Fighter Command repeatedly protested, noting that the entire air defence network might be taken out by an explosive truck on the road outside the building or jamming of the microwave links that fed it. They called for command to be devolved to the radar stations, as it had been in the Type 80 era.

Moreover, the strategic situation changed once again. As the Soviets gained strategic parity with the US, the idea of meeting any Warsaw Pact offence with tactical nuclear weapons was no longer seen as a safe response as the US was now just as deterred from using their strategic forces as the Soviets had been formerly. Additionally, new weapons like the TOW missile fired from attack helicopters appeared to offer an all-conventional method of defeating the Pact. Now it appeared war in Europe would have a long conventional phase, and air attack on England was likely yet unlikely to be nuclear. This was especially true in light of newer long-range Soviet aircraft that could approach the UK at low level and thereby avoid detection altogether.

Studies of a replacement system started in 1972, and multiple reports were produced on the topic over the next year. They proposed using modern commercial computers in place of the specialized systems of Linesman, adding complete digitization of all signals from all radars in the network, upgrading links to their counterparts in NADGE, which were at that time forwarded over voice lines, and devolving command to new hardened CRC centers, remote from the radar sites. L1 would remain in use, but primarily to disseminate information outside of Strike Command (Note: Which, by this point, had taken over from Fighter Command.) and to build the nationwide Recognized Air Picture. The original radar systems of Linesman would remain in the new network, but would be supplanted by low-level coverage provided by decades-old Avro Shackleton aircraft fit with new radars, pending their replacement by similar conversions of the Hawker Siddeley Nimrod. The Royal Navy could also feed in information from their ships.

As had occurred with Linesman, UKADGE soon ran into huge delays on the software side, and was itself delayed well into the 1980s. In spite of glowing reviews by its creators, the system was an utter failure from the start. The Nimrod displayed this in excellent fashion when it was first demonstrating its ability to track unknown aircraft over England but instead demonstrated it was incapable of distinguishing aircraft from cars on the motorway below. The project was eventually cancelled in 1986 in favour of buying several American AWACS aircraft.

=== Decommissioning ===
UKADGE found itself in the same situation as Linesman before it; the lengthy delays, cost overruns and obsolescence led to calls for its replacement before it was operational. This led to the Improved UKADGE or IUKADGE, which further upgraded the computer systems, communications systems, and eventually the radars themselves. While UKADGE had devolved the command systems to survivable sites, the radars themselves were sited close to shore and easy to destroy. A major goal of IUKADGE was to replace the Linesman radars with mobile units that could be stored off-site in secure locations and then brought online quickly after an attack.

Existing sources do not record when the last Type 84 stood down, but it was likely along with the rest of the Linesman sites in 1996.
