= Radar angels =

Radar effect

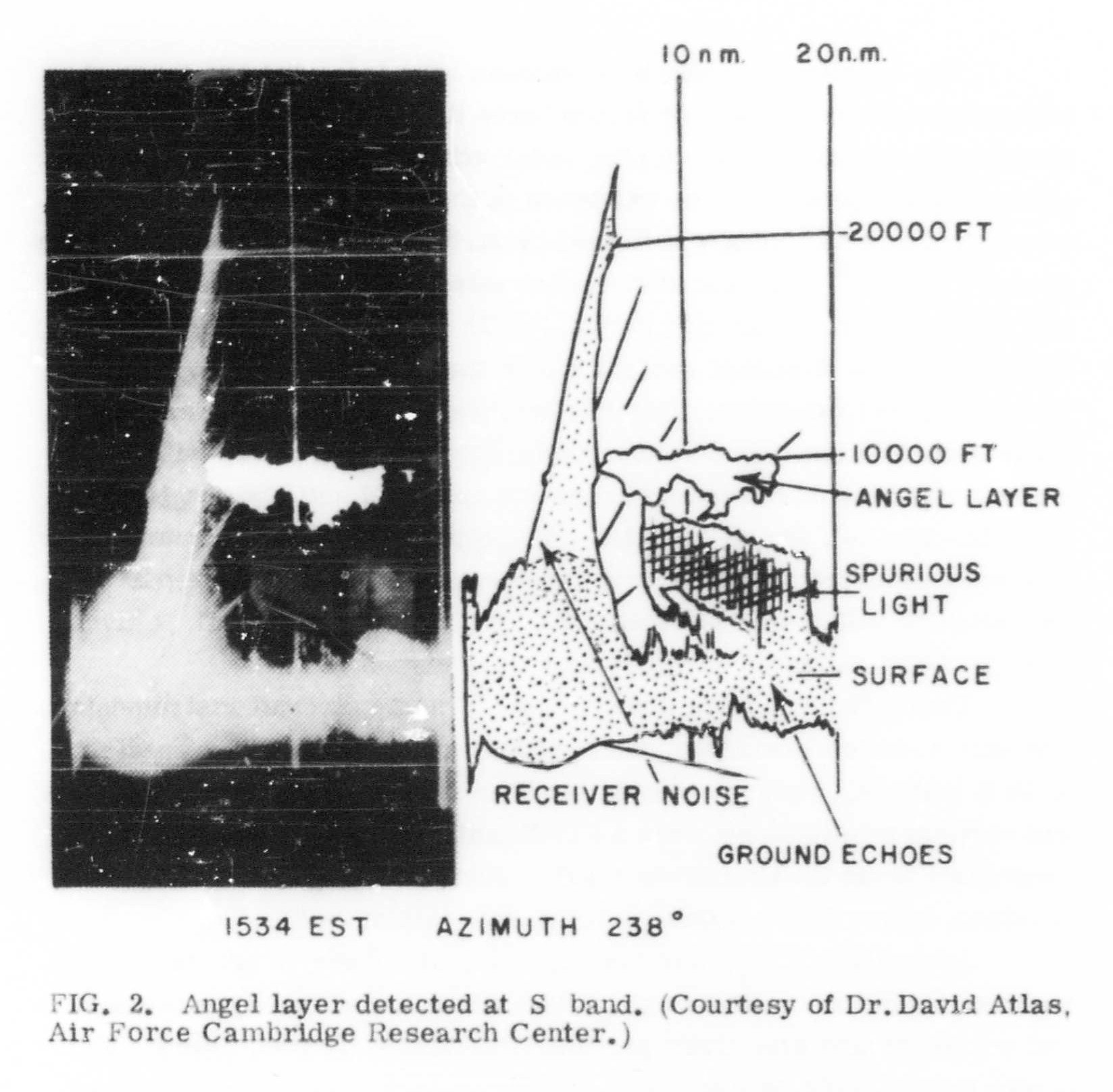
S-band radar angel, from a 1959 technical report.

Radar angels are an effect seen on radar displays when there is a periodic structure in the view of the radar that is roughly the same length as the signal's wavelength. The angel appears to be a physically huge object on the display, often miles across, that can obscure real targets. These were first noticed in the 1940s and were a topic of considerable study in the 1950s. The underlying mechanism is due to Bragg's law.

== History and source ==
Early radars were subject to strong returns from the ground and their plan position indicator displays often featured many permanent echos that blanked out portions of the screen. Angels appeared on these systems, but were difficult to distinguish from these ground returns and generally not noticed. Development of the COHO concept in the UK eliminated these permanent echos, at which point angels were clearly seen for the first time on a continual basis. One of the earliest examples was seen in 1953 on the Radar, Anti-Aircraft No. 4 Mk. 7, one of the first COHO systems. Some of these were identified as flocks of birds, which led one ornithologist to purchase a surplus Radar, Anti-Aircraft No. 3 Mk. 7 to perform bird tracking.

When they were first seen, there was widespread agreement that many such angels were being caused by meteorological effects, but no one was able to explain their behavior based on this theory. It was known that birds could cause radar returns, as this had been noticed very early on Chain Home systems even before World War II. Experiments were performed by the Radar Research and Development Establishment that demonstrated the radar cross section of a dead bird was about 0.01 square meters, about the same as a bag with 1 pound (0.45 kg) water. This is much smaller than the normal detection limit of the radars, and there were certain aspects of the motion that seemed to be at odds with the conclusion these were caused by birds.

In one such example, the experimental COHO MEW radar at Great Baddow noted repeated ring-shaped angels that appeared to be slowly radiating outward from a point and drifting in the wind, but only in the morning. They were convinced this was due to a local factory starting up its steam plant and the resulting hot air was causing the display due to thermals. When they went to the location they found open parkland with a stand of trees.

The mystery was solved when they checked in the morning and found huge flocks of starlings leaving the trees in a curious wave-like pattern. At night, the birds were clustered in trees in the center of the grove and at dawn began tree-hopping towards the outermost trees. Then, based on some invisible signal, all the birds at the outside of the grove would leave at once and begin flying off, radiating outward. As soon as one group left, more birds would, over a period of minutes, individually tree-hop outward to fill up the outer trees and repeat the process. At night, the birds arrived in small groups and did not cause any display to appear.

It was not until the later 1950s that it was widely accepted that birds were the primary cause of angels. This conclusion was eventually put forth in 1957 by no less than the Royal Society:

...they have been widely believed to be of meteorological origin, by reflexion or refraction of energy from atmospheric discontinuities, but no meteorological theory so far proposed has managed to explain all their observed properties. It is shown that these properties can be satisfactorily explained on the assumption that the echoes are received from birds on migration.

With pulse radars, a solution was soon found, known as swept gain in UK parlance and sensitivity time control (STC) in the US. According to the radar equation, the energy of a return signal varies with the fourth power, so nearby objects have much stronger returns and can swamp more distant objects. The idea of STC is to lower the sensitivity of the receiver for nearby targets before reaching maximum gain at longer range, perhaps 50 miles (80 km). By adjusting the magnitude of the gain suppression, the returns from birds can be eliminated while still allowing aircraft to be seen.

== Impacts ==
Although angels were a problem for all radars of the era, they rendered the Canadian Mid-Canada Line almost unusable in the spring and fall when millions of large birds migrated by the stations. This was made worse by the birds landing near the warm diesel generators at the stations. Typical radars send out short pulses of signal, and the STC can be triggered by that pulse. The Mid-Canada Line was a continuous wave radar (CW) that had no inherent timing to its signals, and no corresponding way to mute the signal for nearby objects. The effect was so overpowering that a significant feature of the similar AN/FPS-23 radars used on the DEW Line, then under construction, was the addition of Doppler filtering to remove objects travelling slower than 125 miles per hour (201 km/h) from the display.

Although birds are the most widespread cause of these effects, any periodic structure in view of the radar can cause similar effects. This is particularly notable in sea-scanning radars in aircraft and satellites when the pattern of waves matches some multiple of the wavelength of the radar. This effect has been exploited in radars that measure the sea state offshore, or wind-measuring radars that create the required patterns using acoustic waves generated by large loudspeakers.
