= Exercise Ardent =

1952 RAF military exercise

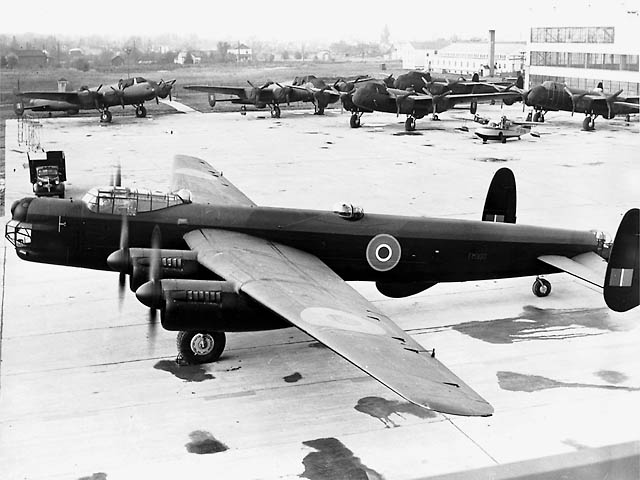
Although considered obsolete, the Avro Lincoln was able to roam around the English countryside with relative impunity at night even against jet-powered night fighters.

Exercise Ardent was a massive military exercise carried out by the Royal Air Force (RAF) over the United Kingdom in 1952. It pitted Bomber Command against a combined defensive force from Fighter Command, Fleet Air Arm, several squadrons of the Royal Canadian Air Force (RCAF) and additional units from the USAF and various European NATO allies. Additionally, various British Army and Territorial Army anti-aircraft forces were included, along with the Royal Observer Corps and their RAF liaisons. Over 200,000 members of the various armed forces were involved in total, with around 1,300 aircraft flying over 7,500 sorties. It was the largest air exercise held since World War II, besting even the multinational Operation Sky Shield of the early 1960s.

The exercise ran in several phases from 3 to 12 October. In most raids, Avro Lincoln and Boeing Washington bombers formed the majority of the attacking force, simulating Soviet Tupolev Tu-4 bombers, while English Electric Canberras and de Havilland Mosquitos were used in a variety of supporting roles during the mock attacks. In some of the operations, fighters from continental bases were used to simulate additional attackers. Defending forces included Gloster Meteor and de Havilland Vampire day and night fighters, RCAF Canadair Sabres and USAF F-86s.

The outcome was not encouraging. At night, interception rates were no better than they had been during the war despite the dramatic performance improvements of the fighters. Worryingly, it was repeatedly found that once the bombers crossed the coastline they became difficult to track and could roam around the countryside without problem. Matters were much better by day, when the fighters could hunt down the bombers on their own after being given initial information about the approach directions. Even then, the Canberra proved extremely difficult to intercept, and those few interceptions that did occur were entirely by luck.

The main issue causing these problems was the speed of the ground controlled interception system that tracked the bombers and vectored the fighters. This was accomplished as it had been during the war, with dozens of WAAFs moving wooden markers around large maps. This led to demands to upgrade the ROTOR radar network with the installation of the AMES Type 80 radars that performed all of these operations from a single large radar display. By the mid-1950s, the Type 80s had replaced the earlier Chain Home and AMES Type 7 of ROTOR, greatly improving interception capability.

== Preparing for Ardent ==
The first major post-war UK air exercise was carried out in 1950 as Exercise Emperor. At the time, the defensive system was largely identical to its state at the end of World War II, with Chain Home radars operating for early warning and, in theory at least, AMES Type 7 radars providing detailed tracking, especially at night. ROTOR intended to greatly improve its effectiveness by networking the system together with extensive telecommunications systems and updated plotting, but this was in its infancy and would not be available in its complete form for several more years. Day fighters were a mix of jet and piston powered, while night fighters consisted entirely of late-model de Havilland Mosquitos.

By the time of Ardent, jet powered fighters of greatly improved capability had entirely replaced piston fighters for day service, and a new generation of jet-powered night fighters had been introduced as well. Additionally, a number of war-era radars had been replaced with microwave-frequency systems that were immune to radar jamming. (Note: Although not for long, the carcinotron jammer was introduced the next year and was extremely effective against these radars.) The single experimental Green Garlic radar was also available for Ardent, the first example of what became the AMES Type 80, offering well over double the range of existing radars and complete 360 degree coverage. Together, these changes represented a significant improvement in defensive capability.

== Major events ==
=== 3/4 October ===
Ardent opened on the night of 3 October with two groups of eight Avro Lincoln bombers each simulating mine-dropping raids on the Firth of Forth and the shipping channel in Great Yarmouth. These raids were countered by Meteor NF.11s. This was followed by a larger group of about 70 bombers, both Lincolns and Boeing Washingtons, simulating simultaneous radar-guided night bombing raids on Glasgow, Grangemouth and Edinburgh. Night fighters were hampered by poor weather at their bases, leaving the bombers largely unmolested.

Still flying by dawn of the 4th, the bombers continued on to attack Liverpool. This was aided by two Mosquitos carrying jammers that approached from the south in order to draw off the fighters. This attempt did not work, instead it simply alerted the radar operators that something was about to happen, and they noticed the main force of bombers immediately as it entered range. This allowed a total of 120 interceptions to be carried out.

During the day, a separate force of nine English Electric Canberras attacked Birmingham. According to Bomber Command records, two of these were successfully intercepted, while Fighter Command only records one interception made by a pair of the brand-new de Havilland Venoms from the test group at the Central Fighter Establishment at RAF West Raynham. In the morning, a group of USAF Boeing B-50s attacked London while RAF fighters flying from European airfields simulating fighter-bombers attacked Fighter Command airfields in the easternmost parts of England.

=== 4/5 October ===
The second day of Ardent included a mass raid by 70 aircraft simulating an attack on Glasgow and then continuing on to drop live ammunition on the Redesdale tank range southwest of Berwick-upon-Tweed. During the second half of the attack, Lincolns and Mosquitos dropped target markers while the two Mosquito jammer aircraft operated nearby. This time a "highly confused situation" developed in the plotting rooms, and a number of fighters were sent after a non-existent raid, so only 40 interceptions were carried out against the main force. The bombers went on to make a mock raid on York while most of the fighters had to return to their bases to refuel after being sent off on the wild goose chase.

During the day on the 5th, a group of USAF Republic F-84 Thunderjets and RAF Vampires attacked airfields while B-50s attacked Glasgow, Liverpool and London. The raid on London resulted in "all the Meteors from Biggin Hill took part in the defence — quite in the best Battle of Britain style." Meanwhile, 100 paratroopers were dropped by Handley Page Hastings aircraft from Transport Command simulating an attack on RAF Patrington while Royal Netherlands Air Force F-84s made a low-level attack on Fighter Command headquarters at RAF Bentley Priory. The later raid was met by Meteors and Canadian Sabres. (Note: The Canadian Sabres were almost brand new, having been introduced in quantity during summer of 1952, only months before Ardent. They so impressed their RAF hosts that Canadair produced 438 of a slightly improved model, the Mk. 4, for use by the RAF mostly with NATO units in Germany.)

Sortie rates during this initial phase of Ardent included an average of 450 attacks during the day and another 200 at night, rates that were comparable to those during the Battle of Britain.

=== 9 October ===
The second major phase of Ardent opened on the night of 9 October, consisting of seven large bomber formations attacking various cities. The raids were timed so that many of them would arrive in the Sheffield area at the same time so they would overwhelm the controllers on the ground. Mosquitos and Lincolns with very high frequency jammers attacked the radio systems used to guide the fighters. On top of this, Canberras made a high-speed attack on Bristol while Belgian Air Force Mosquito NF.30 night fighters performed intruder missions over RAF night fighter airfields.

=== 11/12 October ===
The final missions of Ardent started on 11 October, with Canberras flying high-level day attacks on Glasgow, Carlisle, Liverpool and Cardiff. At night, the Lincolns and Washingtons flew simulated atomic bomb attacks against Bristol, Birmingham and London, approaching across a wide front while the Canberras performed a high-level raid on London.

The next day, 120 of the Lincolns and Washingtons, with jammers aiding, performed attacks on the fighter airfields at West Raynham and Coltishall in the east, and West Malling and Tangmere in the south. While the defending fighters were tied up with these raids, a single Washington performed a low-level attack on the Tilbury Docks and a single Canberra attacked the Ford plant in Dagenham. Other Canberras flew high-level day strikes against Liverpool and Bristol. To top it off, another paratroop landing was performed against RAF Neatishead joined by USAF B-50s, F-84s of the Belgian, Dutch, French and US air forces, and Fleet Air Arm attacks against Royal Navy ships.

== Outcomes ==
=== Bomber Command conclusions ===
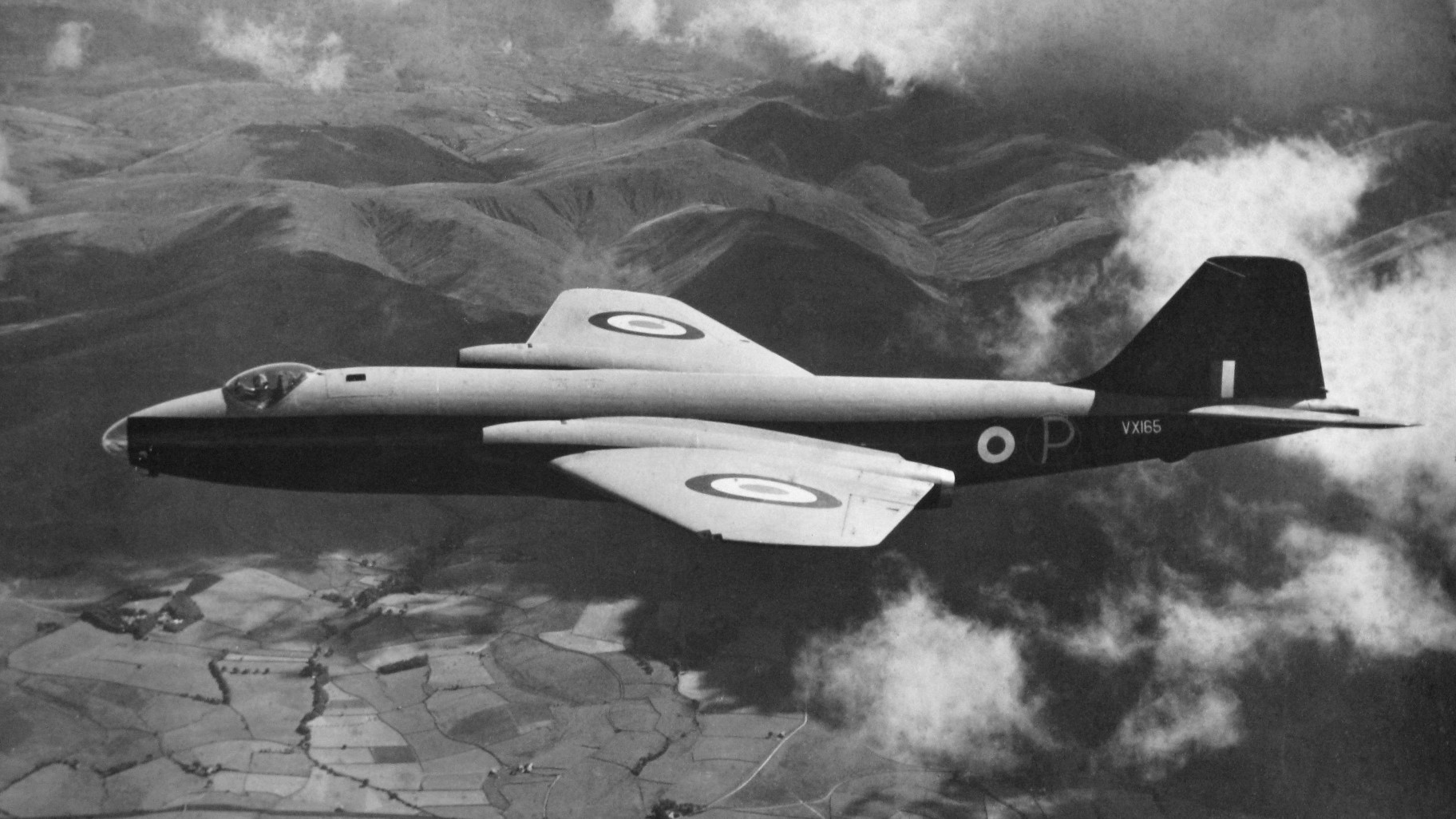
The English Electric Canberra was immune to interception at night, and was only intercepted by day when fighters just happened to fly near them. Bomber Command suggested that the defence was largely useless against jet-powered bombers.

Bomber Command was critical of the exercise, mostly due to the unrealistic limits placed on their operations. In particular, the aircraft were mostly banned from flying at altitudes between 3,000 and 11,000 feet, and the Canberras were limited to only 35,000 feet so the fighters could reach them. Had they been allowed to operate at their most effective altitudes, they would have likely never been intercepted. The interceptions of Canberras invariably occurred when a fighter just happened to spot them during the day and were then ordered to attack after reporting the sighting. They noted that the "percentage of lethal attacks was probably extremely small," and that the night fighters had "absolutely no success" against them. They concluded that the "salient points which emerged from the day and night operations of the Canberras was their complete immunity by night and large measure of immunity, at operational height, by day."

The use of Lincolns and Washingtons, both considered obsolete by this time, was another issue for Bomber Command. In the second daytime raid, every single bomber reported having been intercepted. They concluded that it would be "extremely difficult for Bomber Command to devise any tactics which would reduce these losses within acceptable limits." At night, these aircraft did much better. Notably, the "use of a broad front and low-density raid again embarrassed the defence… these obsolete medium bombers wandered all over the country for hours on end with almost complete immunity from fighter attack once the coast had been crossed." They also noted that the Washingtons suffered more nighttime interceptions than the Lincolns, which they concluded was largely due to their much larger radar cross section, and the lack of flame dampers on the engines – unlike the Lincolns, they had not been designed as night bombers.

Overall, however, the exercise demonstrated what they already assumed; the older bombers were no match for the new generation of fighters, and that the successful defensive operations against these aircraft would be "highly misleading" in terms of indicating whether Fighter Command could be effective. They noted that "Despite the improvements to the defence organization, and in particular the use of jet fighters, the interception rate showed no improvement over that achieved by the former Mosquito fighters. The total number of interceptions made by fighters was larger but this was simply because there were more fighters." They noted that the low performance might be due to the limited endurance of the jets, which limited them to about two interceptions per sortie, while the Mosquitos were known to make many interceptions in a single mission.

Ultimately the main learning opportunity for Bomber Command was the effective use of jamming. In particular, they learned that the trick to use against jet-powered aircraft was not to attempt to draw the fighters away from the bombers, as had been the case in WWII, because the jet fighters could quickly reposition against the bombers when the jamming aircraft moved away. Instead, the jammers should be used to draw the fighters into the air in advance of the bomber's arrival, timing it so the fighters would run out of fuel and return to base just as the bombers appeared.

=== Fighter Command conclusions ===
Fighter Command published a series of reports on Ardent that put a somewhat more positive spin on the events, but ultimately also identified a number of major problems. On the topic of the Canberras, they noted that "Out of 23 interception attempts under GCI control only 11 resulted in sightings. The majority of the failures were due to late scramble action. The exercise showed that speedier control action is absolutely essential if interceptions are to be effected before the bombers attack their targets."

A notable outcome was that all of the day fighters had roughly the same success rate against the Canberras, around 50 to 60%. This was true of both the swept-wing Sabres as well as the older generation straight-wing Meteors. The only aircraft to produce a notably worse showing were the Vampires, but this was accounted for by noting that these aircraft were based "outside the Metropolitan and Eastern Sectors where the bulk of the simulated jet bomber activity took place" and were thus flying greater distances.

In contrast, their conclusions on the night fighters were decidedly less impressive. "There has been no sensible change in the effectiveness per fighter sortie due largely to the shortcomings of the control, and the slow bomber speeds masking the effects of the higher performance of the night fighters." They also noted that the entire system was largely incapable of dealing with shallow penetrations into the mainland, with those under 50 miles (80 km) suffering little. This demanded more early warning time.

=== Report to Churchill ===
Winston Churchill had been invited to watch the operations, in keeping with his role as No 615 Squadron's honorary Air commodore. Unable to attend, he instead had Secretary of State for Air William Sidney, 1st Viscount De L'Isle (Note: Or as he was known at the time, The Lord De L'Isle and Dudley, often shortened to "Dudley".) attend in his place and make a report of his own.

Sidney's report was similar to that of Bomber Command. He suggested that the system as implemented would be adequate to deal with Soviet piston bombers, but that "Against jet bombers of the Canberra type, which now form part of the Russian bomber force the present defences are much less effective, and until the improvements listed above are well advanced we are very vulnerable." He noted that the system as a whole "showed a welcome improvement in the efficiency of the air defences; the interception rate against conventional bombers was most impressive. It has, however, emphasised once again the need to press ahead with current developments." This included the upgrading of almost every aspect of the system; new fighters like the Hawker Hunter and Supermarine Swift by day and Gloster Javelin at night, air-to-air missiles to improve their deadliness, the fully operational command and control system envisioned by ROTOR and various radio and radar countermeasures. "All these matters are in hand but on present form it will be 1955 before we can hope to see the full results."

His conclusions, however, were somewhat different: "The problem of an adequate interception and kill rate is largely one of numbers. We shall never have enough modern fighters to get a sufficiently high rate, when atom bombs are included in the attack, unless we can do something to reduce the attack at its source — i.e. the bases in Russia. This task, for which the smaller atom bomb is specially suitable, is among the first priority for the bomber force, of which the development must proceed in step with the fighter defences."

== ROTOR upgrades ==
Ardent took place before the new Type 80 radars had started installations, and so the ROTOR network controlling the operation had its mix of the original Chain Home and other wartime radars. The single experimental Type 80, still known as Green Garlic at the time, was used in the operation. According to Fighter Command, "the trial set at TEE gave outstanding results during the exercise."

The problems with interception plotting being carried out manually had long been understood to be a significant issue. In the original Dowding system, Chain Home radars would measure the range and bearing to a selected formation, which took some time. These would then be converted to coordinates on the Ordnance Survey National Grid and then relayed by phone to the nearest operations room, where a wooden block would be placed on a large map to represent that formation. Controllers would then direct their fighters towards the targets. As the speeds of aircraft increased, the delays in this system meant the data was always out of date, and against jet aircraft it was essentially useless.

Plans were underway to replace this system when the new Type 80 radars were installed. A system developed by the TRE took the intermediate signal being set to the radar station's displays, the "video", and encoded that into a amplitude modulated signal on a microwave relay. This allowed the image from the radar screen to be sent to a remote location, where it could be combined with similar feeds from other stations and thereby allow the ROTOR operations rooms to have a single unified view of the complete battle without having any manual plotting. This would mean the controllers would see the targets only seconds out of date. While there were high hopes for the combined displays, they never extensively used due to improvements in the radars themselves.

The first production model Type 80 Mark I started installation in 1953 and was handed over to an operational squadron in 1955. During the period from Ardent to the Mark I systems going into service, magnetron design was improving rapidly. An upgraded magnetron was used in the newer Type 80 Mark III, giving it over double the power of the original Mark I. This so greatly increased their effective range, up to 240 nautical miles (440 km; 280 mi) against a large bomber like the Tu-4, that a single Mark III site could control the airspace formerly assigned to several different radars. In areas where more coverage was needed, the remote radars used the transmission system to send their image to one of the Mark III's set up as a Master Radar Station (MRS). The original ROTOR network of 60 radars was cut in half, with a small number of MRS handling both the early warning task and ground controlled interception directly from their screens. In this system there was no need for a separate central location to coordinate the defences, that took place at the MRS. Many of the centralized ROTOR operations rooms, only recently completed, were sold off.

One outcome of Ardent that did have a direct effect on the Type 80 installations was the realization that the lack of radar coverage over northern Scotland allowed the bombers to escape detection and then roam freely along the west. This was particularly problematic for the Navy, who were concerned that long-range bombers could use this route to lay mines in the western ports. As a result, a new seventh air defence sector was added in Inverness, with additional radars in the Shetland Islands and in Northern Ireland.
