= AMES Type 80 =

Cold War-era British early warning radar

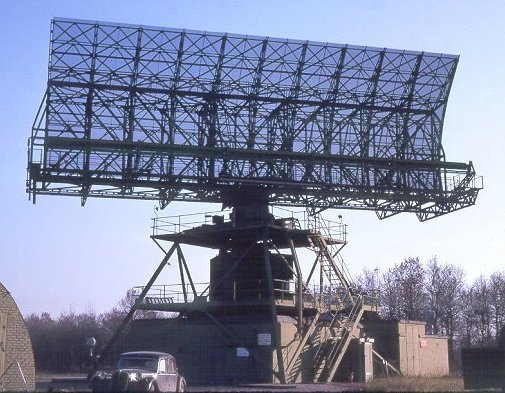
- The Type 80 radar at Metz in France run by the 61 AC&W Squadron of the Canadian 1st Air Division
- Country of origin: UK
- Manufacturer: Decca
- Introduced: 1954
- No. built: ~35
- Type: early warning, GCI
- Frequency: S-band, 2.85 to 3.05 GHz
- PRF: 235 to 300 pps, normally 250 to 270 pps
- Beamwidth: 1/3º
- Pulsewidth: 5 μs
- RPM: 4
- Range: better than 240 nmi (440 km; 280 mi)
- Diameter: 75 ft (23 m)
- Azimuth: 360º
- Elevation: 0–30º
- Precision: 1 mile at 150 nmi
- Power: 1 MW Mark I & II; 2.5 MW Mark III
- Other names: Green Garlic; AMES Type 81

The AMES Type 80, sometimes known by its development rainbow code Green Garlic, was a powerful early warning (EW) and ground-controlled interception (GCI) radar developed by the Telecommunications Research Establishment (TRE) and built by Decca for the Royal Air Force (RAF). It could reliably detect a large fighter or small bomber at ranges over 210 nautical miles (390 km; 240 mi), and large, high-flying aircraft were seen out to the radar horizon. It was the primary military ground-based radar in the UK from the mid-1950s into the late 1960s, providing coverage over the entire British Isles.

In the late 1940s, the RAF developed the ROTOR plan to provide radar coverage over the UK in a phased rollout. As part of Stage 2, a new EW radar with long range would be deployed starting in 1957. A TRE research project, Green Garlic, appeared to be able to fill this role years earlier. The first examples of the Type 80 were being installed in 1953 and became operational in 1955. New sites received updated Mark III models and some formed the Master Radar Stations (MRS) that directly directed air defences, filling the GCI role as well. The original ROTOR plans for over 60 stations was reduced by half, retaining only a small number of older radars to fill gaps. Many of the ROTOR operations rooms, only recently completed, were sold off.

The system was developed during a period of rapid development in both radar technology and the nature of the strategic threat. The introduction of the hydrogen bomb led to serious questions about the nature of the defence, as a single bomber escaping interception was capable of causing catastrophic damage. Meanwhile, the introduction of the carcinotron radar jammer appeared to make such attacks much more likely to succeed. This led to plans to replace the Type 80s even before they were fully installed, relying on a much smaller network known as Linesman/Mediator with only three main sites. Two Type 80s were retained in this network for coverage over the North Sea, and several more were used for air traffic control.

Some of the Mark I models shut down as early as 1959 as the Mark III's increased range began filling gaps. Most of the UK fleet shut down in the late 1960s as Linesman's AMES Type 85s came online. The Type 80 also saw some overseas use by the RAF, with stations in Germany, Cyprus, Malta and Christmas Island. One was used by the Royal Canadian Air Force for operations around Metz. Four were used in Sweden. Potential sales for NADGE lost to a system from Thomson-CSF. The Swedish examples, Tom, Dick, Harry and Fred, were in use until 1978/79. The last Type 80, at RAF Buchan, shut down in 1993 (Note: Different sources say 1993, 1994 and 1997, but Burr clearly states 1993.) after 37 years of operation. A total of about 35 Type 80s were built.

== History ==
=== Chain Home ===
By the middle of 1943, the UK's radar network was in a fairly complete form. It primarily used the Chain Home radars for early warning, supplanted by Chain Home Low and a handful of other special-purpose early warning designs. For fighter direction, or ground controlled interception (GCI) as it was known, the primary system was the somewhat more modern AMES Type 7, with smaller numbers of the advanced AMES Type 14 entering service late in the war. Starting in 1943, with the threat of German air attack waning, the Dowding system began to wind down operations. At the end of the war this process accelerated, as it was believed another war was at least a decade off.

To address the UK's needs during this expected interwar period, in 1945 Group Captain J. Cherry authored "A Memorandum on the Raid Reporting and Control Aspects of the United Kingdom Air Defense Organization", better known as the Cherry Report. It outlined a number of problems in the existing network and suggested a slow improvement to the equipment over the next decade. Much of the work detailed ways to improve the system by sending all of the radar data from the outlying stations to Master GCI stations, instead of having to hand data from station to station as aircraft moved about.

The Cherry Report was soon followed by a series of Defense White Papers covering all of the armed forces, calling for a rapid drawdown of military strength. In the area of air defence, they suggested moving the emphasis to research and development, as they expected there would be rapid technological improvement over the next few years and there was no point building existing designs that would soon be obsolete.

=== ROTOR ===
Events in the late 1940s led to a revaluation of this policy. These included the opening of the Korean War, the Berlin Airlift, and especially the test of the first Soviet atomic bomb in 1949. The Soviets were known to have built copies of the US Boeing B-29 as the Tupolev Tu-4, which could reach the UK while carrying one of these weapons. Several new reports on air defence were quickly produced. By 1950 these had resulted in two broad deployment plans, ROTOR and VAST, covering systems in the UK and overseas, respectively.

ROTOR was to be a two-phase program, initially providing coverage only in the "Core Defended Area" around London, and then gradually expanding to cover the entire British Isles over time. For Phase I, twenty eight of the wartime radar sites would be upgraded with new electronics, a further fourteen "Chain Early Warning" stations using the Type 14 and Type 13 would be added, along with eight new GCI stations with upgraded Type 7's. Many other wartime stations would be shut down. Control would be divided among six Sector Operations Centres, coordinating reports from the radars in their area. Phase I was to be completed by the end of 1952, or 1953 at the latest.

ROTOR Phase II would replace the early warning portions of the network with a dramatically more powerful Microwave Early Warning (MEW) radar, which would push the detection range out and give the operators more time to deal with aircraft that were now expected to be jet powered. It would also mean fewer stations would be needed to provide complete coverage, and the coverage would extend over the entire British Isles.

For both phases of ROTOR, shorter-range radars like the Type 7 and Type 14 would continue to fill the GCI role. It was understood that the GCI radars would have to be replaced at some point, and by 1950 there were several radar systems under consideration for this role. The two Phase II concepts were formalized under Operational Requirements OR2047 for the early warning system, and OR2046 for the GCI system.

It was also realized that passing the information from the early warning to the GCI radars would be problematic, so ROTOR also called for the construction of six Sector Operation Centers (SOCs) to coordinate the information being provided from the EW radars. Four of these were newly built underground bunkers, while two were rebuilt from WWII control centres. Plans began to develop a system to automatically forward information from the radars to the SOCs and combine it onto a single large display.

The cost of Phase I was enormous; £24 million for construction, £8.5 million for new electronics, and £19 million for telecommunications systems. In modern terms, this is £1249 million in 2025. Despite this, the system was already seen to be almost useless against new jet powered aircraft. A report by the RAF Fighter Command's Air Officer Commander in Chief stated:

For a 500 knot bomber flying between 40,000 and 50,000 ft, the order to scramble must be given before the bomber is within fifteen minutes flying time, or 125 miles, from the coast. An additional five minutes are required for the appreciation to be made by the controller, and a further 3 1/2 minutes to allow for the delays from the first detection to display on the General Situation Map. These time allowances total 23 1/2 minutes, which represent a distance of approximately 200 miles of early warning. The average range of early warning to be expected from ROTOR or the present CH stations is 130 miles. ... It will, therefore, be seen that the overriding requirement to enable interception to be made is the extension of early warning from the ROTOR figure of 130 miles to a minimum of 200 nautical miles.

=== Green Garlic ===
The ROTOR plans were taking place during a period of rapid technical development at the UK's radar research establishments — the RAF-oriented Telecommunications Research Establishment (TRE), the Army-oriented Radar Research and Development Establishment (RRDE), and the Navy's Admiralty Signal Establishment.

Among the important advances in the immediate post-war era were higher-power cavity magnetrons over 1 MW, and the introduction of new wide-bandwidth low-noise crystal detectors. In 1950, the TRE combined these crystal detectors with new electronics and produced a microwave-frequency receiver that added 10 dB of signal-to-noise ratio, slightly more than three times the sensitivity of previous designs. The radar equation is based on the 4th root of received energy, meaning that three times the energy results in about a 75% increase in effective range. Combining the new receiver with the more powerful magnetrons suggested a doubling of the effective range was possible.

To test these concepts, the TRE built a lash-up system using two antennas from the Type 14 radars, placing them side by side on a Type 7 turntable, and replacing the Type 14's 500 kW cavity magnetron with a new 1.5 MW model. The resulting system had an antenna that was effectively 50 by 8 feet (15.2 m × 2.4 m), with a beam-width of 1/2 degree. The first example, known as Green Garlic, (Note: There is some confusion between sources when the name Green Garlic was introduced, and to which machines it was applied. Gough introduces it for this experimental machine on page F-7.) was operational on 18 February 1951, and a few days later it demonstrated its ability to detect de Havilland Mosquito and Gloster Meteor aircraft at ranges of 200 nautical miles (370 km; 230 mi), and track them continually at 160 nautical miles (300 km; 180 mi) while flying at 25,000 feet (7.6 km), a rather dramatic improvement over the roughly 50 nautical miles (93 km; 58 mi) maximum range of the original Type 14. Against an English Electric Canberra at 45,000 feet (14,000 m), the maximum range was increased to 230 to 250 nautical miles (430 to 460 km; 260 to 290 mi) and tracking range to 200 nautical miles (370 km; 230 mi).

With relatively minor improvements, Green Garlic could fill most of the requirements of OR2047, yet do so years earlier than the MEW. This led to changes in the ROTOR plans so that these new radars, referred to within the plans as Stage IA, or Stage 1 1/2, would be deployed as part of ROTOR Phase II. Not only would the system be ready earlier than MEW, it would eliminate many of the existing WWII-era stations saving £1.6 million in installation costs, and another £1.5 million a year in continued operations. Almost all design effort within the TRE switched to the Stage IA, leaving little manpower available for the original MEW. MEW's development was spun off to Marconi Wireless Telephones.

=== Type 80 development ===
Development of a production version of Green Garlic was mostly concerned with the design of an antenna that would provide more vertical coverage than the horizon-scanning pattern of the Type 14. A further increase in angular resolution was also desirable, and these two features led to a much larger antenna. This, in turn, led to the need for a more robust turntable than the Type 7. An added advantage of the larger antenna would be that the energy of the beam would be concentrated into a smaller angle, only 1/3 of a degree. This allowed it to overpower jammers, a significant problem for the Type 7 where roughly 500 kW of power was spread over a 3 degree width.

An order for eight production units was delivered in July 1952, (Note: Gough says eight on page 128, but it is not clear if these were all production units or if this includes the prototype system produced in 1952.) with Decca building the electronics, Currans the turntable assembly, and Starkie Gardiner the 75 by 25 foot (22.9 m × 7.6 m) semi-parabolic reflector antenna. At this time the system was given the name AMES Type 80, separating them from wartime designs that were numbered in the teens. The first of the units would be purely experimental and would be installed at RAF Bard Hill, the following six units were expected to be installed through 1953 and be operational in mid-1954. This set of quickly installed systems was carried out under "Operation ROTOR 2".

The design's improved resolution allowed it to distinguish between closely spaced targets at 95 nautical miles (176 km; 109 mi), well over twice the range of the Type 7. That meant it could potentially fill the OR2046 GCI role as well. This would benefit from even higher angular resolution, but much more important was its ability to scan at higher altitudes so that the area above the station would be at least partially covered. Faster scanning rates would also be desirable. This could be accomplished through the design of a somewhat modified antenna, which became the AMES Type 81. However, as the Type 14 was seen as adequate in the short term, this project was given lower priority.

Within the RAF, a new term began to be used, a "horizon limited radar", a system that could see anything above the radar horizon. Due to the curvature of the Earth, and assuming the maximum possible altitude of an air-breathing aircraft was about 60,000 feet (18,000 m), this corresponds to a range of 320 nautical miles (590 km; 370 mi). For the new Type 80's 210 nmi nominal range, this meant it could see anything above about 22,000 feet (6,700 m).

=== Exercise Ardent ===
To gain familiarity with the design, and to compare its performance with earlier systems, TRE built a second experimental set. This used an example of the new antenna mounted back-to-back with the original Type 14 antenna on a Type 16 turntable. (Note: Burr refers to a system known as "Richard" as one of the early units. This might refer to this example.)

The system was operational in October 1952 and took part in that year's air war-games, Exercise Ardent. Ardent was, by far, the largest air exercise carried out since the war. RAF Bomber Command carried out a total of 2,000 sorties, met by 5,500 sorties by RAF Fighter Command. At its peak, the rate of sorties matched that of the Battle of Britain.

Green Garlic proved to give "outstanding results" and was a highlight of the exercise. But Ardent also demonstrated that ROTOR's limited coverage over northern Scotland provided a "back door" route that allowed bombers to elude the fighters. Concerns expressed by the Admiralty that this route could be used to mine western ports led an order for an additional eight Stage IA radars in February 1953. These would be placed in Scotland, the Shetland Islands, and Northern Ireland. A new sector operations centre in Inverness would handle traffic in this area. This expansion became known as ROTOR Phase III.

This change results in some confusing terminology. Originally, ROTOR was to be in two phases, describing both the expansion of the network and its upgrading with the new radars. Now the Stage IA radar would be used with ROTOR Phase II and III, while the original Stage II radar was no longer associated with any of ROTOR's phases. (Note: To add further confusion, the term "Stage I radar" may refer to any radar of ROTOR Phase I, or specifically to the upgraded Type 14's used in the early deployment. Likewise, the term "centimetric early warning", or CEW, may refer to the Type 14's, or to the Type 80, or even the L-band developments. The stations hosting the Type 80 are also normally referred to as CEW. Gough uses all of these terms in different ways throughout his book.)

=== First installations ===
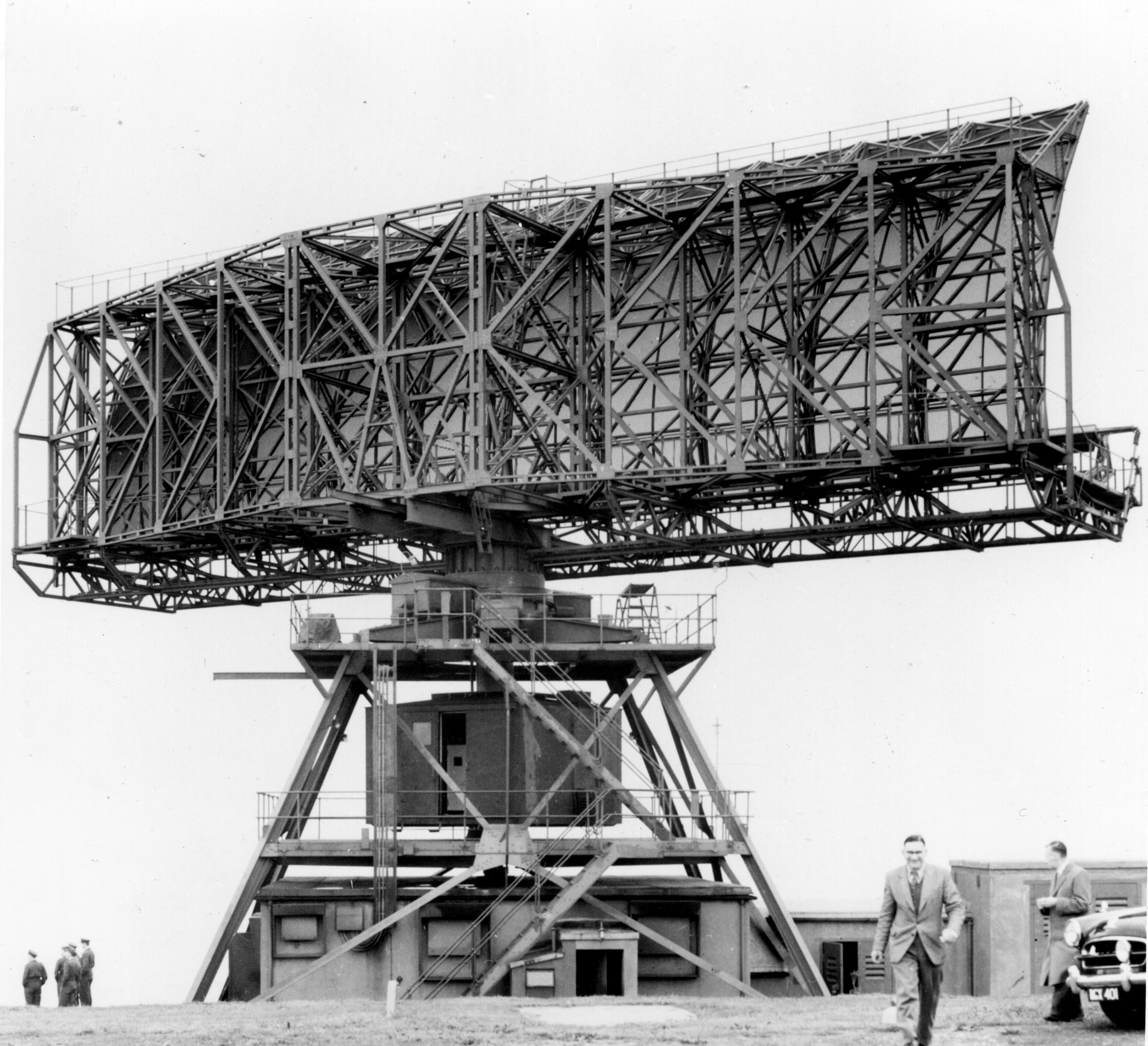
Some feeling of the immensity of the Type 80 can be seen in this photo of men standing beside the prototype at Bard Hill.

In January 1953, Bard Hill had been selected as the site for a prototype of the production design. Construction of the system at was carried out through the year. As the parts arrived and lessons learned from their installation, the design was further modified. By the end of the year, the final design of the Type 80 was released. At the same time, the order was increased to eleven units.

The first true production unit began installation at RAF Trimingham in early 1954, taking much of the year to complete. The transmitter antenna was initially installed in the wrong position relative to the receiver above it, but this was corrected by repeatedly moving it and testing it. The only issue requiring modifications to the basic design was a minor change to the oil system in the 8 foot (2.4 m) diameter bearing that supported the antenna. This became the pattern for following systems, and the original order of seven units was installed to this new standard.

The Trimingham system was demonstrated to NATO officials in October 1954. This was part of an effort to develop a NATO-wide air warning system that would eventually emerge as the NATO Air Defence Ground Environment (NADGE). Trimingham was handed over operationally to the RAF in February 1955, about six months later than initially expected, but still well over two years before the original ROTOR plans called for the MEW's to be installed.

=== Buildout ===
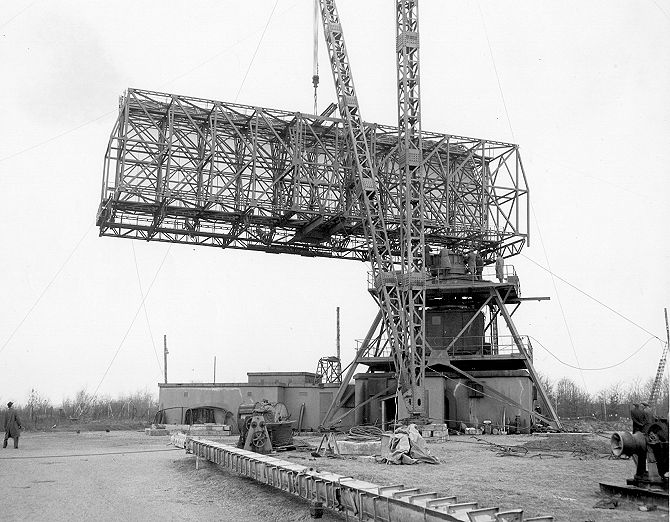
The main bearing of the Type 80 at Metz failed in March 1958 and had to be replaced. This was a non-trivial operation that took three months to complete.

ROTOR I was not completed by the end of 1953 as expected, as the upgraded Type 7's proved to be rather problematic and it was not until early 1955 that the systems were all modified to correct the problems. These delays closely matched those of the Type 80 installations. In July 1955, the ROTOR I system was declared "complete to all intents and purposes".

Following Trimmingham, another five systems were to come online at a rate of one per month. When these were complete, after a nine-month delay, construction would begin on the Type 81 stations, eventually reaching a total of twenty-one Type 81s. ROTOR III added another ten stations in Northern Ireland and western Scotland, completing the coverage of the British Isles.

By this time a number of Type 80s were ready for service entry, although Trimmingham and the next installation at RAF St. Margarets were still being corrected for antenna position. One additional system was arranged to be taken over by the Royal Canadian Air Force (RCAF) for delivery in the summer of 1955. This later unit would be used by the 1 Canadian Air Division to control the airspace used by the Second Tactical Air Force. By October, four of the Type 80s were in service, late but well on the way to completing the original Phase IA. A fifth Mk. I system in the UK, as well as the RCAF Mk. I in Metz, were operational by the end of 1955.

Several improvements were considered as the construction of the original units continued, including the addition of a new 2 MW magnetron and a pressurized waveguide system to keep humidity out of the piping to prevent arcing. In January 1957, the installation at RAF Saxa Vord was subjected to 90 nautical miles (170 km; 100 mi) wind loads which strained the antenna, and demanded changes to the support framework and mounting system.

As the second batch of stations neared their construction start dates, there was not enough time to get the new magnetron into production. Adopting only the new waveguide, these systems became the second production Mark I design. (Note: AP3401 refers to a Mark IA design, which Gough does not mention. It is likely the second batch are these Mark IA systems.) A greatly strengthened antenna and mounting design intended for all of the northern bases became the Mark II.

=== Mk. III ===
As early as 1950, the RAF had considered several solutions to the original Phase II GCI requirement, including the Royal Navy's new Type 984 radar, the Army's Orange Yeoman, and an adaptation of the Type 80. By mid-1953, the Air Ministry made the firm decision to use the Type 80-derived Type 81 rather than the other designs. Because the Type 81 spread its signal over a much greater vertical angle, the amount of energy in any given area was lower. This meant the design would have less range than the Type 80 even though it was otherwise similar.

One of the other side-effects of the original improper installation of the transmitter at Trimmingham was the observation that the vertical angle of the coverage pattern could be raised by moving the transmitter. This seemed to eliminate the need for the separate GCI radar, and any given radar could be made into a Type 80 or Type 81 simply by moving the antenna between two pre-set positions. After some experimentation, the Type 81 name was dropped, and the new concept became the Type 80 Mark III. Another change was to allow the turntable to mount two antennas back-to-back. (Note: Existing sources do not state what the back-to-back mounting option was intended to do. It does not appear that it was ever used in operation. The Type 84 also had this option and was installed with a second antenna, but it was never used for its original purpose of highly-accurate IFF.)

While this was being considered, the new 2 MW magnetron finally became available in quantity. These were added to the Mark III specification, offsetting any loss of range due to the increase in vertical angle. This also led to the curious situation that the new Mark III radars not only performed the GCI role, but also had a longer early warning range than the Mk. I and Mk. II installations. It was at this point that the Mark III began to have a significant influence on the ROTOR program.

GCI radars had previously been located inland for two reasons. One was that their range was relatively short, so they needed to be spread out geographically so their coverage overlapped in the defended area. Secondly, in order to reduce local reflections, the Type 7's had to be installed in natural depressions, typically bowl-shaped valleys. In the case of the Mark III, neither of these apply; the range of the system was so great that it could cover the entire inland area even if sited on the coast, and local reflections were avoided by the much narrower beam of the radar, which could aim away from obstructions. This implied that the number of stations in the network could be reduced significantly.

=== Carcinotron and strategic changes ===
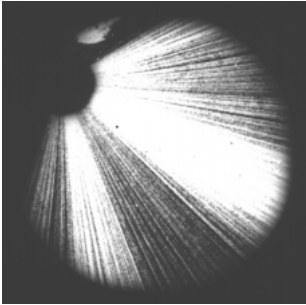
This image shows the effect of four carcinotron-carrying aircraft on a Type 80-type radar. The aircraft are located at roughly the 4 and 5:30 locations. The display is filled with noise any time the antenna's main lobe or sidelobes pass the jammer, rendering the aircraft invisible.

It was during this same period that the growing concern over the carcinotron valve entered the discussion. First announced publicly in 1953, the carcinotron could rapidly tune across a wide band of the microwave region by changing the input voltage. By sweeping the transmission through the entire frequency band of the radars the aircraft might meet, the jammer would fill the radar display with noise that would render the aircraft invisible. Older jammer systems could do this, but only after isolating the radar frequencies being used and tuning their transmitters to match them, a time-consuming process. If there was more than one radar in the area, or the aircraft moved into a different radar's view, all of this had to be repeated. The carcinotron could sweep so rapidly that it could barrage all potential frequencies, allowing it to jam all the radars in the area at the same time with little or no operator input.

To test whether such a system would actually be effective, the RAF purchased a carcinotron from the designers at CSF and fitted it to an aircraft christened Catherine. In tests beginning in late 1954, the jammer proved to be able to render the area around the aircraft unreadable, even when the aircraft was still below the radar horizon. In one test, any aircraft 20 miles (32 km) to either side of the jammer was invisible. As the jammer aircraft approached the radar station, the signal would be picked up in the radar antenna's side lobes, until the entire display was filled with noise and nothing could be tracked anywhere. It appeared that the decade-long effort to provide radar coverage for the UK was being rendered useless at a stroke.

Through the same period, changes in the strategic environment were leading to questions about the ultimate role of defensive operations. Early post-war thinking treated nuclear weapons in a fashion similar to large conventional ones; the total damage caused by an atomic bomb was less than that of the thousand-bomber raids, and a single atomic attack was unlikely to eliminate a target. In this case, a protracted battle might occur in which the RAF and Army would seek to attrite the Soviet force so that follow-up attacks would become ineffective, essentially a damage-mitigation strategy.

This thinking changed with the Soviet Joe 4 test in August 1953. While not a true hydrogen bomb, it was clear it would not be long before they had one, which came to pass in late 1955 with the RDS-37 test. In contrast to fission weapons, which had to be delivered relatively close to their targets, the hydrogen bomb was so powerful that it could be dropped within miles and still be effective, especially in a strategic role against cities. With the accuracy demands greatly reduced there was no need for the bomber to fly over the target for aiming, one could drop the bomb from long range or use a booster to form a simple stand-off missile. This meant the close-in defence offered by the ROTOR system was largely useless; the enemy bombers would now have to be stopped well before they reached their target areas.

The RAF spent much of 1955 considering how these changes affected the overall air defence picture. They had already given up on the concept of a close defence based on anti-aircraft guns and handed the SAM mission from the Army to the Air Force to be integrated into their interceptor operations. Now they were questioning the entire idea of widespread defence and increasingly seeing any system purely as a way to ensure the survival of the V bomber force. In keeping with this mission, by April 1955 the plans had changed with the removal of two of the Mark III stations, at RAF Calvo and RAF Charmy Down. Now the remaining seventeen Mark III stations were expected to be operational in March 1958.

=== 1958 Plan ===
In April 1956, the same month ROTOR I was declared fully operational, the new "1958 Plan" was released. ROTOR II and III disappeared, along with another two stations at RAF Hope Cove and RAF St. Twynnells. This left a smaller network, mostly Type 80 Mark III's, dividing the country into nine sub-sectors. The entire air defence mission, from initial tracking to planning the interception, would be carried out entirely from these stations. Interceptions would be plotted on new 12 inches (300 mm) displays, while the overall image would be displayed on the Photographic Display Unit, which had originally been developed for ROTOR Phase II command centres.

Within each sector, there would be multiple radars, with the "comprehensive" stations running the operations as a whole, with backup radars, either GCI or early warning, feeding them information. This deployment plan had three phases; the first would simply build new command and control centres at eight of the existing GCI sites and build a new one at Farrid Head, phase two would convert another 19 ROTOR sites to "satellite" stations, and finally, the system would be tied together and automated with computer systems.

These new comprehensive radar stations, later known as Master Radar Stations, had the side-effect of greatly reducing the total complexity of the reporting and control system. The total number of stations was reduced from 37 of ROTOR III to 28, many of the operational centres would not be needed, and 3,000 full-time manpower requirements could be removed while at the same time expanding from a 2-shift to 3-shift round-the-clock operation. The fact that ROTOR only operated during daylight hours had been a subject of some embarrassment when it was revealed in the US press. The plan was ratified at a meeting on 21 June 1956.

By June 1956 the sites of the original ROTOR II and III plans were being installed, although a number had been cancelled. Five Type 80 Mk. I's were in operation at Trimmingham, Beachy Head, St. Margarets, RAF Bempton, and RAF Ventnor. Three Mk. II's had been installed, one replacing the Mk. I at Saxa Vord, one at RAF Aird Uig and another at RAF Killard Point. Fourteen Mk. III stations were in various stages of completion. By February 1957, the plan had once again fallen behind schedule. The delivery date for the first of the twelve remaining units was pushed back to October 1957, with the network supposed to be fully completed by October 1958.

=== Plan Ahead ===
At a meeting on 8 January 1959, the shrunken 1958 Plan was declared complete, with eight GCI stations having been converted to MRSs. This had already allowed the six Sector Operations Centers and a number of other facilities to be closed. The only remaining work was to re-arrange the consoles in the interception offices, which would be carried out until 1962. The Air Council agreed that no further work should be done on the existing network.

Just as the introduction of the hydrogen bomb upset the layout of the ROTOR system and led to the 1958 Plan, by the mid-1950s concerns over the carcinotron were growing. The initial response was released in January 1959 as Plan Ahead. Plan Ahead was similar to the 1958 Plan in general concept and network layout, but used the new Type 84 and Type 85 radars which had even longer effective range and were much more resistant to jamming. The network would be linked together using new computer systems to allow all of the interceptions to be handled from two Master Control Centers, with the MRSs now reduced to backup.

Within the government, opinion was that Plan Ahead was itself facing a threat that appeared to render it useless. In this case, it was the introduction of the intermediate range ballistic missile (IRBM). IRBMs based in East Germany would hit the UK in about 15 minutes, potentially with no warning as the existing radar systems would not see them on their high trajectories far above the horizon. These missiles were simpler and less expensive than the intercontinental ballistic missiles (ICBMs), which meant they would be deployed earlier, likely by the mid-1960s. They had low accuracy, but when armed with hydrogen bombs, they were capable of hitting the V-bomber bases and rendering the UK deterrent force impotent.

In the new environment, air defences were simply not useful. Even if they worked perfectly and every enemy bomber was shot down, the country would be destroyed by missiles anyway. The only defence was deterrence, so it was absolutely essential that the V bomber fleet be given enough warning to launch into their holding areas safe from attack. After discussions with the US, it was agreed to build a BMEWS radar in the UK, giving the bombers enough warning to launch.

There was considerable debate on whether there was a need for crewed interceptors at all, but a scenario emerged that led to their requirement. If the Soviets flew aircraft far offshore and jammed the BMEWS radar, they could force the RAF to launch the V bombers to staging areas while the threat was investigated. If they repeated this exercise, they could wear out the aircraft and crews. In this scenario, the main purpose for crewed fighters would be to shoot down jammer aircraft, which could fly outside the range of SAMs. There was no need to defend anything outside the immediate area of the BMEWS and V force airfields.

As the cost/benefit ratio of a nationwide air defence system was limited in the age of missiles, Plan Ahead was repeatedly scaled back. It was eventually merged with civilian air traffic control and reemerged as the Linesman/Mediator system. The goal of the new system was to provide guaranteed detection of an actual attack, as opposed to spoofing by jammers. Any such attack would trigger the V force to launch.

=== Type 80 in service ===
The Type 80s, by this time, had proven their utility. It was decided to keep several of the systems active in the new network to provide warning of aircraft attempting to approach from the North Sea along the Norwegian coast. In this case, even complete jamming of the Type 80 was acceptable, as it would still provide a warning that Soviet aircraft were aloft, without effecting the operation of the main stations far to the south.

Plans for a NATO-wide network continued, and the Type 80 was offered for the main EW radar in this network. Ultimately the various systems were divided among the NATO countries, and the EW role was given to Thomson-CSF (today part of Thales Group). In the end, the UK's contribution to NADGE was a Marconi height finder. The only third-party sales were to Sweden, which had already purchased the Decca DASR.1 radars for civilian air traffic control. The deal for four Type 80's was announced to be worth "several million pounds". In Swedish service, it was known as the PS-08. The four Swedish examples, all Mark III's, served from 1957 until 1979.

=== Further improvements ===
The Type 80, and any radar working in the S-band, was subject to strong returns from rain or even very heavy clouds. The mid-1950s period while the Type 80's were being installed was one of intense research and development in the radar field. Two of these developments were considered for addition to the existing Type 80 sites to solve the rain problem, but only one of the two was installed.

The first solution to this problem was to use a "logarithmic receiver", a form of automatic gain control that muted down very large signals so it did not overwhelm any smaller ones in the same area. The second was to add a delay system to the antenna to cause the signal to be circularly polarized. Such signals will undergo a reflection phase change when they reflect off of small round objects, but larger objects including round portions of aircraft, are too large to cause this. By filtering out signals with the opposite polarization, the signal from the rain is strongly suppressed.

Ultimately only the logarithmic receiver was adopted, as it consisted solely of a small amount of additional electronics, while the polarizer required significantly more work and changes to the antenna. The logarithmic receiver also had the advantage of offering anti-jamming improvements as jammers tended to be very strong signals, and thus were also muted down in the same fashion.

Another major addition was a COHO-based moving target indicator (MTI) system. MTI removed slow-moving objects from the display, both still objects like hills and local buildings, as well as things like waves which could become strong reflectors at high sea states. Adding MTI not only decluttered the display, but also allowed the transmissions to be aimed much closer to the ground and thereby offer much better coverage at low altitudes. RRE had led the development of these systems.

=== Missile role ===
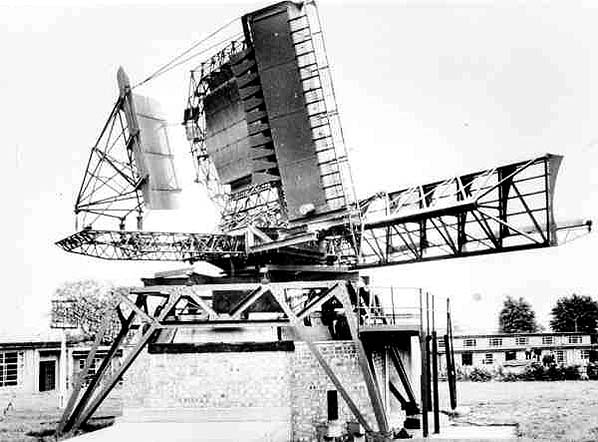
The Type 82 had a complex antenna that allowed it to measure altitude as well.

In 1958, the AMES Type 82 began trials at RAF North Coates. This radar was shorter-ranged than the Type 80, but had built-in height finding, more accurate tracking, and had an electromechanical computer to allow it to easily track many targets. It was originally designed for the British Army to sort and filter approaching aircraft and then hand off selected targets to the Yellow River radars that aimed the anti-aircraft artillery. When the air defence role was handed to the RAF, Type 82 went with it and became the warning system for the Bloodhound missile.

The RRE stopped development work on the Type 80 in 1960 as their attention turned to the newer systems like Type 85. However, the increased accuracy of the Mark III suggested it was technically capable of "laying" the Yellow Rivers. Work began on converting the Type 80 for this role, which would eliminate the need for the separate Type 82 network.

Normally when used in the GCI-role, the absolute location of the objects is not important, only the relative positions of the target and interceptor are needed – if a given radar rotates everything five degrees clockwise on the display, it does not make a difference to the operator as both the interceptor and bomber are rotated by the same amount and their positions relative to each other remain the same. For the SAM role, where the location of the missile was fixed on the ground, the sites had to be accurately calibrated to the local terrain so angles measured off the radar display could be sent to the missile sites who would then direct their radars in that direction.

Solving this problem was relatively difficult due to a problem in linear slotted waveguides like the one used to send the signal to the reflector. This caused a slight angle to develop between the waveguide's physical orientation and the actual signal produced. This problem, known as "squint", normally amounted to a few degrees. Correcting for this required the site to be accurately calibrated against external objects, a time-consuming but not technically challenging operation. As the amount of squint changes with frequency, changing the magnetron during maintenance caused the calibration to be lost once again as each magnetron has a slightly different natural frequency. The solution to this problem was the addition of a small telescope to the head frame of the radar, which was read off against landscape points made by surveyors.

To coordinate the motion of the beam on the radar display with the antenna, a selsyn was fixed to the gantry and driven by the rotation of the radar head. It was found that the selsyn moved in its mount and its angle reporting changed as the antenna rotated. This was a small effect, but enough to upset the measurements for missile direction. This led to the last mechanical modification to the Type 80s, moving the selsyn from the gantry to a fixed location below it on the ground where it was rigidly fixed. This was first trialled at RAF Patrington and then rolled out to the other sites that needed it.

In 1963 the SAM role was handed off to the Type 80s at RAF Patrington and RAF Bawdsey, which had been upgraded to send this data to the missile sites in digital format. This arrangement was short-lived, however, as the missiles were stood down in the UK in 1964.

=== Move to air traffic control ===
In 1959, a number of existing facilities were turned over to the joint RAF/Royal Navy Military Area Radar Control Service (MARCS) to provide high-altitude long-range air traffic control in busy areas. These stations were known as Air Traffic Control Radar Units (ATCRU), and organized around four major centres, Ulster (Killard Point), Southern (Sopley), Mersey (Hack Green) and Border.

During the 1950s, military aircraft flew at altitudes and speeds that no civilian aircraft could match, so there was no interference between the two and the RAF was used to flying as they wished above about 30,000 feet (9.1 km). Likewise, unknown aircraft flying at high altitudes and speeds demanded investigation. The introduction of the first jetliners like the De Havilland Comet presented a significant new challenge, as these aircraft flew at roughly the same speeds and altitudes as the military aircraft. Very shortly after moving to MARCS, these radars began to host civilian operators as well, becoming the Joint ATCRU, or JARCRU.

Type 80's were not the only radars moved to the ATC role. The Type 82s that the Type 80s replaced in the missile role was put into ATC use almost immediately, covering an area that was regarded as one of the most disorganized regions in the UK. In the future, Type 84's would also find themselves in the high-cover role as well.

=== Removal from service ===
Changing priorities, development problems, and budget constraints all led to the deployment of Linesman/Mediator being greatly stretched out over more than a decade. Through this period the Type 80s and ROTOR control centres remained the primarily air-defence network in the UK. It was not until the late 1960s that Linesman's AMES Type 84 and AMES Type 85 radars began to replace the Type 80s, with most of the handover being declared complete in 1968.

The Killard Point installation in Northern Ireland was supposed to be replaced by the first production Type 84, which had originally been installed at RAF Bawdsey. Bawdsey planned to stand down as part of the move to Linesman, and its duties would be taken over by RAF Neatishead. However, a fire in the R3 bunker at Neatishead delayed these plans, and it was not until 1970 that the Type 84 could be moved. By that time the plans had changed slightly, and the Type 84 was instead installed at nearby RAF Bishops Court, and the Type 80 at Killard Point was left operational and remotely operated from Bishops Court. The civilian air traffic control services paid for the installation of a digitizer ("plot and code extractor") to feed information from Bishops Court's displays into the overall ATC network.

Similar fates befell the Type 80's at Saxa Vord in the Shetland Islands and RAF Buchan north of Aberdeen. Saxa Vord was retained purely as an early warning source; even if they were jammed to deny tracking information, that would still provide a clear warning of an approaching raid to the main air-defence network far to the south. Saxa Vord was part of the long-term Linesman plans, but ultimately became part of the NADGE network, and financial control passed to NATO while still staffed by the RAF. It was damaged by the wind on several occasions after 1956; on 27 January 1961, the entire antenna was blown off its mounts and had to be replaced. As it was handed to NADGE, a radome was constructed to protect it from the wind, but the radome was also damaged on occasion.

Buchan was not part of Linesman, and was originally planned to be shut down when Linesman came online. However, as was the case for Killard Point, by the 1960s Buchan was providing valuable air traffic information. In October 1969, it was decided to keep the location operational, proposing to replace the Type 80 with an AMES Type 88/89, a tactical control radar developed for the English Electric Thunderbird missiles, which would be available in 1971 as the UK drew down its presence in the Middle East. Like Killard Point, the Type 80 was not immediately replaced, and instead operated side by side by newer systems. It was ultimately the last Type 80 to stand down, running long after the others until 1993. Its closing ceremony was attended by some of the original Decca production engineers.

== Description ==
=== Antenna ===
The Type 80 used a 75 by 25 foot (22.9 m × 7.6 m) shaped semi-parabolic reflector made of wire mesh held in shape by a steel tube framework behind the mesh. The antenna was shaped to provide a cosecant-squared pattern, which broadcasts less energy at higher angles, where the targets are closer, such that the amount of energy returned from near or far targets is evened out.

The signal was end-fed into a slotted waveguide array running across the front of the reflector, which can be easily seen in photographs. The waveguide was pressurized to eliminate humidity and prevent arcing. The system's vertical coverage could be adjusted by moving the waveguide, but this was difficult and time-consuming and normally done only on the initial installation. In the Mark III models, an identification friend or foe (IFF) antenna was mounted in front and below the waveguide, about 1/4 the main waveguide's length.

The technique of feeding high-power microwaves through slip rings was not fully developed when the Type 80 was being designed, so the radio frequency portions of the system are located in the "cabin" below the reflector, rotating with it. Entering the cabin to service the components required the operators to wait for the appropriate time and then jump onto the rotating platform, which was normally turning at 24 degrees-per-second.

The entire system was held aloft on a 25 foot (7.6 m) tall truncated-pyramid of steel beams, with the microwave cabin in the centre and the antenna on top. The modulator was located in a separate building under the cabin at the base of the pyramid, and the motor-generator in a building beside it, just outside the legs of the pyramid. The antenna's rotation was driven by four electric motors, although the number in use at any given time depended on the wind. The normal rotation speed was 4 rpm, but it could run as high as 6 rpm if needed.

=== Electronics ===
The cavity magnetron providing the microwave signal was pulsed by delivery of 25 kV direct current pulses from a modulator fed by 600 V 12-phase AC power and then converted to DC using an enormous mercury-arc rectifier known as the "Mekon", named for The Mekon, one of the arch-enemies of Dan Dare in the comic series. This was placed in a metal cabinet to protect operators from the powerful ultraviolet light it produced. The power was fed to the cabin above via slip rings. The 12-cycle power was, in turn, generated by a large motor-generator run on the local three-phase supply. This was located in a separate building beside the modulator building.

Each station operated on its own allotted frequency from 2,850 to 3,050 MHz. A significant improvement in the Type 80 compared to earlier radars was an automatic tuning system that allowed it to easily adjust to changes in the frequency as the magnetron warmed and cooled, and especially when it was serviced or replaced. In previous systems, such changes required a lengthy process of re-tuning the receiver, tube-by-tube. In contrast, this Automatic Frequency Control ensured the output intermediate frequency was always 13.5 MHz, no matter what was being broadcast.

The receiver was split in two, entering linear and logarithmic amplifiers. The logarithmic helped eliminate returns from rain, clutter and anomalous propagation (anaprop). However, this was at the cost of the loss of weaker signals due to the logarithmic amplification of noise as well.

=== Master Radar Station layout ===
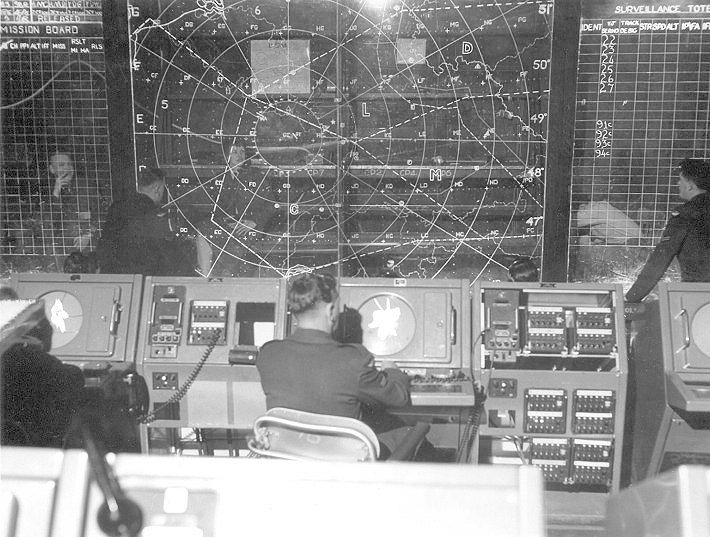
This image shows the interior of the AMES Type 80 control room operated by the Canadian 1st Air Division in Metz, France. In the foreground are several of the Type 64 consoles, and in the background, the side-lit perspex plot board and tote boards showing known missions on the left and tracks on the right. The MRS used much of the same equipment, although the plot was replaced by the PDU.

Each of the Master Radar Stations had a series of displays and consoles similar to those of the earlier Type 7 installations, or the later ROTOR Sector Controls. In the main Control Room was a pit that contained a large plexiglass table that displayed information being projected upward from the Photographic Display Unit. This map provided the overall "air picture" of the action in that MRS's area of operations. Commanders above the PDU table could watch the development and movement of aircraft and then hand off targets to the individual operators.

Outside of the Control Room were a variety of operational offices. Primary among these were the "fighter control cabins" that included a Console Type 64, which was centred on a 12 inches (300 mm) cathode ray tube display, which was a large format for the era. Each station was given control of a single interception duty, talking directly to the pilot to fly them in the direction of the target until the fighter's own radar picked it up. Aiding them were the operators in the "heights cabin", who had the single duty of measuring the altitude of the targets. This was indicated by one of the other operators placing a "strobe" on a selected target and then pressing a button on their console. This sent a signal to a heights operator who received the angle and range, and then slewed one of their radars, typically an AN/FPS-6 purchased from the US, to that angle and began searching vertically for a target at about the same range. If one was detected, they strobed the target on their display, which sent the angle to a calculator that extracted the height and then sent the result to the requesting station.

All of this was run from the "radar office" located one floor below the operations areas. This room contained the equipment that calculated altitude from the angle, passed messages between the various offices, ran the identification friend or foe system, produced map imagery that could be displayed on the consoles, and also in some cases received information from remote radars. This latter task became more common when the ROTOR system was being upgraded to Linesman, and new radars were put into operation from the same R3 bunker.

== Locations ==
Most of this list is primarily from McCamley (table, p. 91) and Gough (diagram, p. 144), both of which concentrate on the UK-based sites that were part of ROTOR or the 1958 Plan. Additional Type 80's are known to have been used in both the UK and elsewhere, and these have been added from Appendix Two and the slightly different list in Appendix Three of "The Decca Legacy", with additions from Adams and AP3401. A number of stations that appear in Gough were not completed as the network was repeatedly cut back, including Hope Cove and St. Twynnells.

User	Location	Notes
Mark I
RAF	RAF Bard Hill	Prototype
RAF	RAF Trimingham	Satellite station for Neatishead. First production Mk. I.
RAF	RAF St. Margarets Bay	Satellite station for Bawdsey.
RAF	RAF Beachy Head	Satellite station for Wartling.
RAF	RAF Bempton	Satellite station for Patrington.
RAF	RAF Ventnor	
RAF	RAF Treleaver	Satellite station for Hope Cove.
RCAF	Metz, France	1 Canadian Air Division
Mark II
RAF	RAF Saxa Vord	Mk. I upgraded to Mk. II. Satellite station for Buchan.
RAF	RAF Aird Uig	Satellite station for Faraid Head.
RAF	Fort Madalena, Malta	
Mark III (listed roughly geographically)
RAF	RAF Buchan	Master Radar Station, Sector 1. Early install of Mk. I and then upgraded. Last Type 80 in service.
RAF	RAF Anstruther	Satellite station for Boulmer. Now used as a museum.
RAF	RAF Boulmer	Master Radar Station, Sector 2. As Buchan, originally a Mk. I.
RAF	RAF Seaton Snook	Satellite station for Patrington.
RAF	RAF Holmpton/Patrington	Master Radar Station, Sector 3.
RAF	RAF Skendleby	Satellite station for Neatishead.
RAF	RAF Neatishead	Master Radar Station, Sector 4.
RAF	RAF Bawdsey	Master Radar Station, Sector 5.
RAF	RAF Ash	Satellite station for Bawdsey. Formerly RAF Sandwich.
RAF	RAF Wartling	Master Radar Station, Sector 6.
RAF	RAF Sopley	Possibly used briefly as a satellite station for Wartling, but moved to JATCRU use early.
RAF	RAF Ventnor	Adams has images of a Type 80 at Ventnor, but it is not listed in Gough. Likely satellite for Wartling after Sopley became a JATCRU.
RAF	RAF Lytham St. Annes	Satellite station for Killard Point. Today known as Warton Aerodrome.
RAF	RAF Killard Point	Master Radar Station, Sector 8. Now known as Bishops Court, the location of the Type 84 installation.
RAF	RAF Scarinish	Satellite station for Killard Point.
RAF	RAF Faraid Head	Master Radar Station, Sector 9.
RAF	Brockzetel, Germany	
RAF	Breckendorf, Germany	
RAF	Uedem, Germany	
RAF	Auenhausen, Germany	
RAF	Troodos Station, Cyprus	
RAF	RAF Christmas Island	
Swedish Air Force	Tom	
Swedish Air Force	Dick	
Swedish Air Force	Harry	
Swedish Air Force	Fred	Adams postulates this to be a redundant RAF model.

== See also ==
- The Bendix AN/FPS-3 was the closest US equivalent.
- The P-10/P-12 contemporary Soviet system, but operating in the VHF band.
