= AN/FPS-30 =

The Bendix AN/FPS-30 was a long-range search radar deployed at Distant Early Warning Line (DEW Line) sites in Greenland. It was an advancement over the AN/FPS-19 radars deployed in Alaska and Canada, being optimized for use in severe Arctic conditions. It was planned as a replacement, however cost constraints led to it only being installed at the Greenland DYE sites. In accordance with the Joint Electronics Type Designation System (JETDS), the "AN/FPS-30" designation represents the 30th design of an Army-Navy electronic device for fixed ground search radar. The JETDS system also now is used to name all Department of Defense electronic systems.

== See also ==
- List of radars
- List of military electronics of the United States
