= RAF Bishops Court =

Former Royal Air Force station in County Down, Northern Ireland

RAF Bishopscourt
- Downpatrick, County Down in Northern Ireland

Site information
- Owner: Ministry of Defence
- Operator: Royal Air Force
- Controlled by: RAF Flying Training Command

Location
- Shown within Northern Ireland RAF Bishopscourt (the United Kingdom)
- Coordinates: 54°18′20″N 005°34′09″W

Site history
- Built: 1943
- In use: 1943-1992
- Battles/wars: European theatre of World War II; Cold War

Airfield information
- Elevation: 9 metres (30 ft) AMSL
Runways
Direction	Length and surface
00/00	Concrete
00/00	Concrete
00/00	Concrete

Royal Air Force Bishops Court or more simply RAF Bishops Court is a former Royal Air Force airfield, radar control and reporting station located on the south east coast of Northern Ireland, approximately 5.8 miles (9.3 km) from Downpatrick, County Down, Northern Ireland and 24.7 miles (39.8 km) from Belfast, Northern Ireland. A Marconi AMES Type 84 radar was located on the airfield and an AMES Type 80 radar was located at Killard Point, Ballyhornan (remote from the station itself). An AMES Type 93 mobile radar was also located on the airfield from 1989 until the station closed.

== History ==
=== Airfield ===
The Class A bomber airfield opened in April 1943 with a main runway of 2,000 yards (1,800 m) and two subsidiaries of 1,400 yards (1,300 m).

Dwight D. Eisenhower landed at Bishops Court in May 1944 while inspecting airfields.

The airfield reopened in March 1953 for training for the Korean War but closed again in April 1954.

A number of different units were based at the airfield:

- 819 Naval Air Squadron
- No. 7 Air Observers School RAF between (17 May 1943 and 15 February 1944
- No. 12 Air Gunners School RAF between 1 August 1943 and 31 May 1945
- No. 7 (Observers) Advanced Flying Unit RAF between 15 February 1944 and 31 May 1945
- No. 7 Air Navigation School RAF between 31 May 1945 and 4 June 1947
- No. 2 Air Navigation School RAF between 4 June and 1 October 1947
- No. 3 Air Navigation School RAF between 3 March 1952 and 14 April 1954
- No. 671 Gliding School RAF between 22 January 1959 and September 1962
- No. 664 Volunteer Gliding School RAF between February 1987 and 31 October 1990

=== Radar station ===
RAF Bishops Court formed part of the UK Military Air Traffic Service, as one of four reporting stations it was to control its sector (North Atlantic) and was commanded by HQ Military Air Traffic Operations (MATO) at RAF Uxbridge and RAF Strike Command at High Wycombe. The site was known as Ulster Radar and had both a military and civil role. In its civil role, the civilian personnel (using the military radar) controlled air traffic, primarily over the Atlantic to ensure correct height and separation.

The Irish Republican Army fired five mortar bombs at the radar site on 11 September 1989.

The responsibilities of the site were assumed by the air traffic control centre at Prestwick, Scotland, in October 1978. The radar equipment was soon removed from the site, however the RAF remained. In the early 1980s new bunkers were constructed and a mobile radar was installed. The decision to close the 577 acre (2.3 km^{2}) site was taken in the late 1980s and it was put up for sale in the period 1991–1995.

Alexander Galt, the famous Scottish artist, was stationed here during the war. While there, he painted murals on the wall of the Officers' mess. The paintings are still visible.

== Current use ==
Since the sale, the land surrounding the runway has been used for agriculture, while the land at one end of the site (including some of the airfield runways) has been used for motor sport being called Bishopscourt Racing Circuit. Today at least one runway remains intact and is used by gliders, the married quarters are now civilian housing.

In 2003, it was reported that Bishopscourt was a contender for a Ryanair airfield in the south of Northern Ireland. While the site would require significant infrastructure improvement if this were to happen, the former RAF station would fit into the Ryanair business model (selecting airports some distance from a capital/major city with low landing fees and providing transport to that city.

== See also ==
- Linesman/Mediator
- List of former Royal Air Force stations
