= RAF Ventnor =

Former RAF radar station on the Isle of Wight

RAF Ventnor
- Near Ventnor, Isle of Wight in Isle of Wight
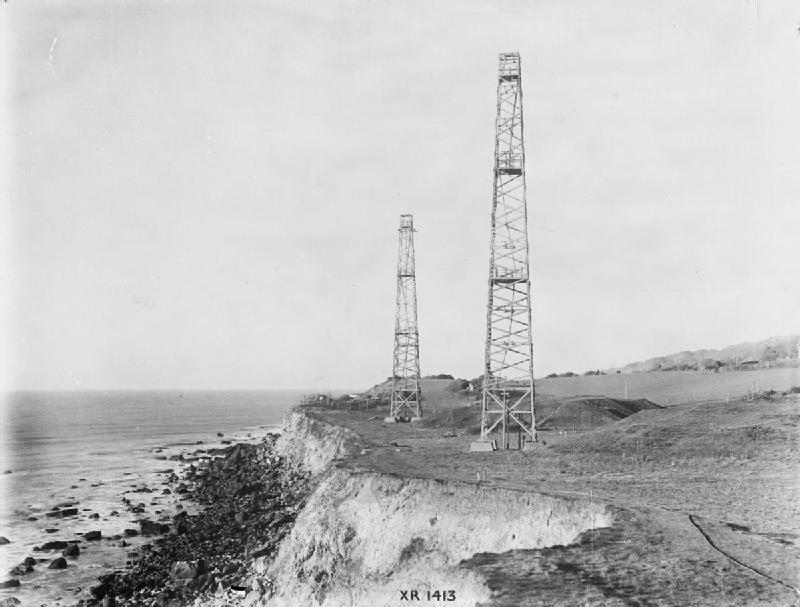
- Radar receiver towers and bunkers at Woody Bay near St Lawrence, a 'Remote Reserve' station to Ventnor radar station

Site information
- Type: Radar Centre
- Owner: Ministry of Defence
- Operator: Royal Air Force

Location
- Location within the Isle of Wight# RAF Ventnor (the United Kingdom)
- Coordinates: 50.6°N 1.183333°W

Site history
- Built: 1938
- In use: 1938–1961

Royal Air Force Ventnor or more simply RAF Ventnor is a former Royal Air Force radar station located 0.7 miles (1.1 km) north east of Ventnor on the Isle of Wight, England. It was initially constructed in 1937 as part of a World War II coastal defence programme codenamed Chain Home. The site played an important role during the Second World War, providing early warnings of incoming bomber attacks carried out by the Luftwaffe.

The site was also part of the ROTOR programme in the 1950s as a Centimetric Early Warning (CEM) station, keeping a constant watch for suspicious Soviet bombers. During the time, an extensive bunker complex was also built at the site, which would later be converted for use as a shelter in case of a nuclear strike during the Cold War. Most of the buildings and facilities at the site have since been demolished, with the bunkers now sealed shut following unauthorised access.

== History ==
=== World War II ===
Following the development and introduction of early-warning radars during the mid 1930s in locations such as RAF Bawdsey and Orford Ness, the Air Ministry set out a programme of building a ring of coastal radar stations around the British coast to provide early warnings of air attacks, codenamed Chain Home (CH). Ventnor was one of 20 original Chain Home stations authorised in 1937 and became operational in October 1938 using experimental transmitters and receivers in temporary hutting. The site, like most Chain Home stations, was powered by the National Grid but had electric generators to cover for interruptions in the supply. The station subsequently went on 24-hour watch from early 1939 and was put on a war footing on 24 August 1939 in preparation for war.

On 12 August 1940, four Chain Home stations were targeted for bombing by the Luftwaffe, including RAF Ventnor. The radar station suffered considerable damage with most of the buildings being damaged or destroyed. However, casualties were light with only one soldier being injured. Following this attack, a mobile installation were set up and remained in operation until the station was repaired.

The site played an important role during Operation Overlord, the codename for D-Day, monitoring both ship and aircraft movements involved in the landings. From June 1944 onwards the station was active in detecting incoming German V-1 flying bombs.

By November 1947, Ventnor was one of 26 radar stations still in use in the UK with the Type 24 long range microwave height finder and Types 52 and 53 radars still operational.

=== 1950s–1960s ===
Following the threat from the Soviet atomic bomb project, the British Government set up a plan to introduce an air defence radar system to counter possible attacks by Soviet bombers, codenamed ROTOR. RAF Ventnor was chosen to participate in the programme. In the early 1950s, the site was re-activated as part of Phrase 1 of the ROTOR programme.

The site (codenamed OJC) was operated by the No.23 Signals Unit under the control of the Ground Control Intercept (GCI) station RAF Sopley. In 1952 the site was remodelled as one of seven underground Centimetric Early Warning (CEM) station, designed to provide more accurate information on the height, range and size of an attacking force compared to the World War II Chain Home radar stations. The bunkers, made of ten feet thick reinforced concrete, housed RAF workers who kept a constant watch for any suspicious aircraft up to 300 miles away. Most of the radar operators and technical personnel working at Ventnor at the time were teenagers, serving their period of compulsory National Service.

By the end of 1956, the AMES Type 80 had been added to the site. Ventnor remained operational until 1957 before being placed into care and maintenance.

=== 1960s–1990s ===
The Royal Air Force decommissioned the site in 1961 and, from 1962, it was used by the Civil Aviation Authority (CAA) as a communications station. In the 1960s, the Linesman radar programme was established with the intention of combining military and civil aviation control, known as Linesman/Mediator. The programme refurbished and improved radar defences at Ventnor.

Until the 1990s, the site was involved in the detection and interception of intruding Warsaw Pact aircraft, using the Marconi Type 264A radar and secondary surveillance radars.

The operations bunker was refurbished as the Isle of Wight Council's Control Centre and remained in operation until 1991 as the Isle of Wight Emergency Command Centre for command and control of the island in-case of a nuclear attack.

== Preservation ==
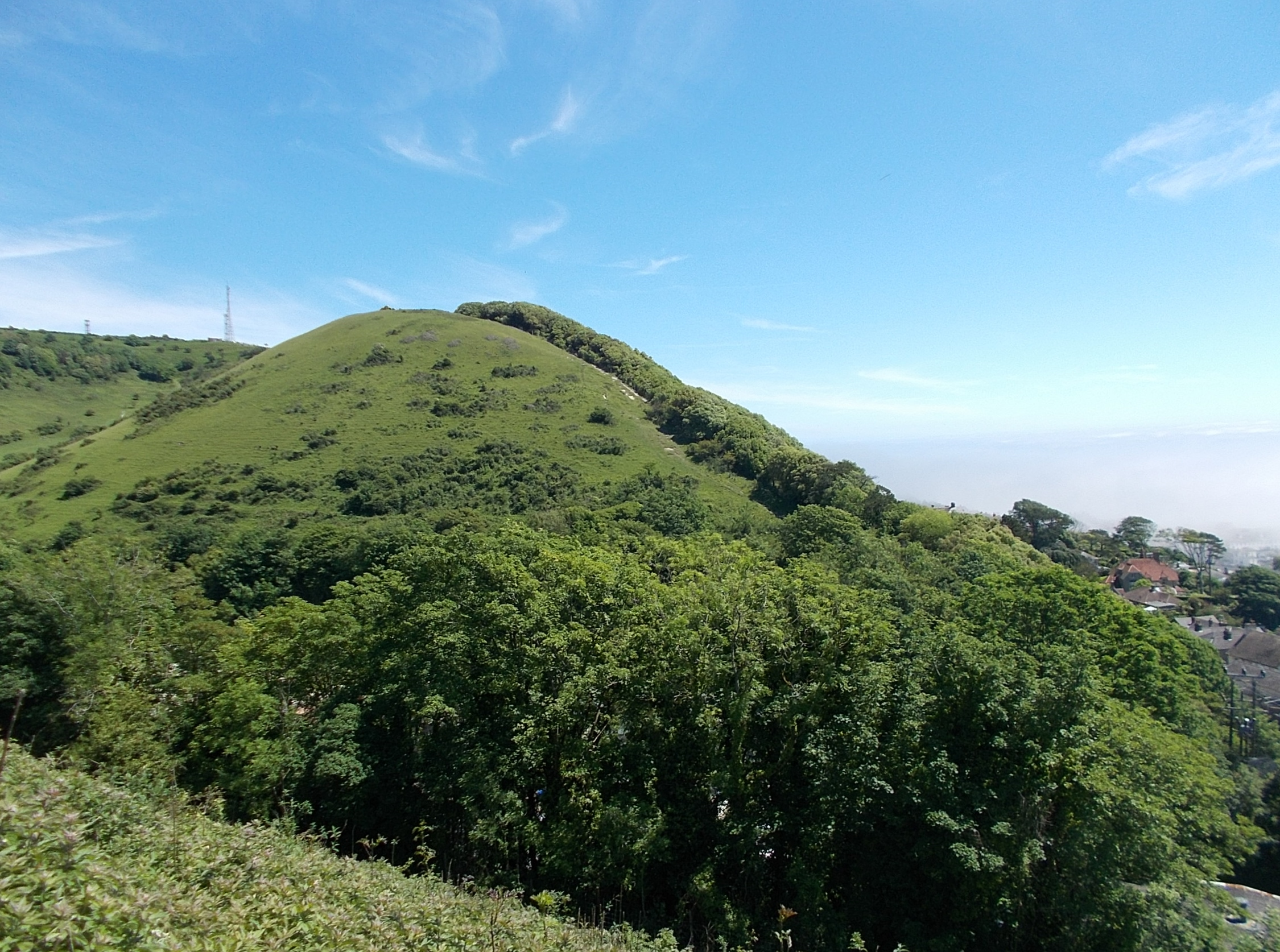
View of St Boniface Down (location of RAF Ventnor) in 2018

The guardhouse, air vents and emergency staircase of the bunker were demolished in 1991 and the bunker itself was eventually sealed shut in 2004 following unauthorised access. Some of the original features of the site are still present, such as mast bases. As of 2014, the central compound still remains and is in used by NATS for air traffic control with telecom masts owned by other companies also present. The surrounding land is in the care of the National Trust.

The surviving components of the original 1938–1939 Chain Home radar station, such as the receiver building, the three receiver tower bases and any remains of the former station defences including a pillbox, is considered a Grade II listed building for their "architectural interest and degree of survival" and for their "historic interest (history of radars)."

== See also ==
- List of former Royal Air Force stations
