= Photographic Display Unit =

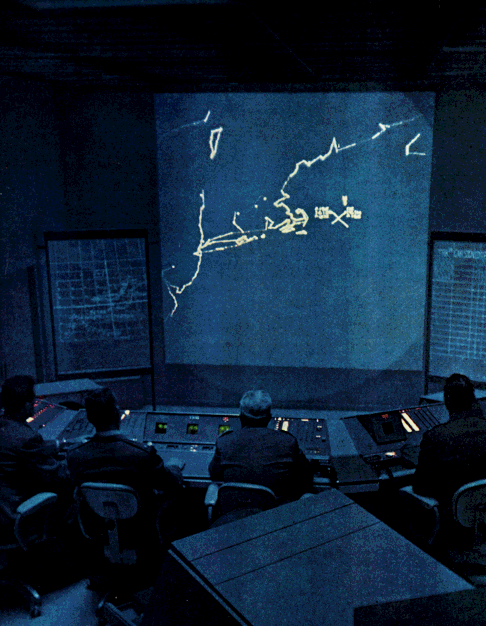
In the SAGE displays, the imagery was generated by the FSQ-7 computer, not directly from the radar display.

The Photographic Display Unit, or PDU, was a large-format display system used by the Royal Air Force to present radar images for interpretation by a number of operators and commanders. Made by Kelvin Hughes, it projected a 6 feet (1.8 m) diameter image that could optionally be overlaid with a map and range rings. The PDU was originally designed for the ROTOR system and subsequent AMES Type 80-based Master Radar Stations. A smaller version with a 24 inches (610 mm) display was used onboard Royal Navy ships, and a larger version projected onto movie screens was used in the SAGE system in the US.

== Description ==
The PDU was essentially an automated 35mm film processing system. A bright cathode ray tube duplicated the image from one of the radar consoles, while the film was exposed in front of it through an f2 lens. Each complete scanning rotation of the radar took 15 seconds, but as it reached a selected location, normally opposite the direction the radar was designed to observe, the film was pulled out from in front of the lens and a new frame pulled into place.

The recently exposed frame then moved through four stations, moving through one every 15 seconds. The first sprayed it with a developer, the next with water, then a fixer, water again, and then it was dried with an air blower. The entire developing process took one minute, after which the frame was pulled into a large film projector that shone upwards into the bottom of the plotting table.

Plotters viewing the table from the top used methods developed in World War I to maintain tracks for the various aircraft. As each new frame appeared, they would place small arrow-shaped markers on the new location, leaving behind the ones they had placed earlier. This produced a trail that indicated the direction of travel. The plotting table was normally covered with a large sheet of semi-transparent paper that contained a National Grid map and allowed the operators to make notes directly on its surface.

Each PDU was fed from a 1,000 foot (300 m) reel of film. Two machines were used at each site. When the film or developer system ran low or there was any sort of problem, the operator could switch to the second unit simply by moving a mirror under the projector. The used reel could then be removed and used as a record of action.

The Navy version differed only in size, using 16mm film and being generally smaller.

The US SAGE system used the PDU hardware to project an even larger display onto a movie screen, which was used for overall battle control in the "subsector command post", more widely known as the "blue room". In these systems the original CRT was replaced with a charactron driven by the FSQ-7 computer, outputting both graphics and character data onto the film.
