= The Leader Herald =

- Type: Daily newspaper
- Owner(s): The Daily Gazette Co.
- Editor: Miles Reed
- Headquarters: 53 Church Street Gloversville, NY 12078
- Circulation: 7,390 Daily (as of 2017)
- Website: leaderherald.com

The Leader Herald is a daily newspaper, serving the upstate New York Fulton, Hamilton, and Montgomery counties with a strong emphasis on Fulton County. The newspaper headquarters is located in Gloversville, New York.

== History ==
A three-part series of articles published by the Leader Herald in 2017 on the Ku Klux Klan's presence in the community were the subject of criticism. Critics including Gloversville Mayor Dayton King said the article overestimated the number of Klan members in the area, made multiple factual errors, and resembled a "recruiting effort" for the KKK.

In 2021, the paper's owner The Nutting Company, which is a owned by Ogden Newspapers, sold it to The Daily Gazette Co.
