= COHO =

COHO, short for Coherent Oscillator, is a technique used with radar systems based on the cavity magnetron to allow them to implement a moving target indicator display. Because the signals are only coherent when received, not transmitted, the concept is also sometimes known as coherent on receive. Due to the way the signal is processed, radars using this technique are known as pseudo-coherent radar.

COHO can be inexpensively implemented in analog electronics and was widely used in the 1950s into the 1970s. As newer solid-state systems and fully digital processing became inexpensive, COHO became less widely used and is today found only on certain low-cost systems.

== Description ==
In a basic sense, moving target indication (MTI) systems work by comparing two pulses of a pulse-radar's received signals. Moving targets will shift the "blips" slightly, although this may be too small to see by the operator, especially for long-distance radars where the motion of even fast targets may be too small to detect. MTI works by storing one received signal and comparing it to the next pulse. The two are then compared by inverting one signal and adding them together. The signals from non-moving objects thus cancel out, while even small motions create phase shifts that can easily be detected by analog phase detectors.

MTI requires the pulses to be stored for the length of the pulse repetition frequency. Analogue devices capable of cleanly storing high-frequency signals in the microwave region are not common, so the solution is to use a much lower frequency intermediate frequency (IF) signal as the basis for the pulse, feeding this into a frequency multiplier before amplification for broadcast by a device like a klystron. On reception, the signal path is reversed, producing an output similar to the original IF. This lower frequency can be stored in a number of analog devices like an analog delay line.

This concept works fine for radars using amplifiers like a klystron, which amplifies an input signal from another device, normally a highly stable source like a crystal oscillator. However, the cavity magnetron does not work in this fashion; as a consequence of its physical construction, when fed electrical energy it produces a microwave frequency output in a single step. There is no oscillator creating the original signal, and this means there is no reference signal to compare to. Further complicating matters is that the output of the magnetron varies from pulse to pulse, slightly in frequency and often strongly in phase. As phase differences are used to detect the targets, this makes the device even more difficult to adapt to MTI.

COHO solves these problems by using the output of the magnetron to produce a stable reference signal. It does this by tapping off a small amount of the output using a directional coupler, and then feeding that into the first stages of the receiver. This produces an IF signal that contains the precise phase of the broadcast, typically with outputs in the range of 1 to 60 MHz, suitable for storage in a delay line.

This IF signal is first sent to phase locked loop or similar system, providing an accurate and stable reference signal. This portion of the COHO circuitry is known as the stable oscillator or STALO.

Objects that are visible to the radar will reflect the signal, and the phase of the signal will depend on its precise distance from the antenna. This returned signal is amplified in the IF section as well. The output from this receiver is then compared with the STALO signal in a phase detector. The detector outputs a signal only where the signals differ in phase, which occurs wherever there is an object. The result is a series of short pulses of output. This signal may be used as the video, and may be sent directly to a radar display.

This technique does not itself reveal moving targets, that still requires pulse-to-pulse comparison. This can be accomplished by splitting the output of the phase detector, and sending one half into an acoustic delay line with the same delay time as the pulse repetition frequency. This means the signal from the last pulse will exit the delay at the same time as the next pulse is being received. One of the signals is then inverted, typically from the delay line, and added to the new signal. This results in an output signal only where the two signals changed.

If the target is moving, and thus its exact distance is changing relative to the radar, the phase of the received signal will change from pulse to pulse and will produce a signal in the final video. Non-moving targets will have (roughly) the same phase pulse-to-pulse, and their signal will be eliminated. The velocity of the target along the line-of-sight determines the change in phase pulse-to-pulse, so over a series of pulses, the difference in phase will vary. The rate of variation in phase is the same as the Doppler frequency that would be seen in a fully coherent Doppler radar, and can be used to determine the radial speed of the target.

A significant disadvantage of the COHO design is that it cannot be used in frequency agile radars. Those change their frequency from pulse to pulse, so pulse-comparison techniques like COHO do not work. For these roles, a coherent signal source like a klystron is needed. It is also difficult to change the parameters of the radar like the pulse width or pulse repetition frequency, as the storage devices were typically implemented in mechanical delays that had to be changed, although a small selection of pre-set selections could be used.

COHO was widely used from the early 1950s into the 1960s, but the introduction of increasingly powerful klystrons and newer travelling wave tube systems displaced the magnetron from most military radars by the 1970s. More recent systems based on various solid-state elements are coherent as well. Digital electronics with the performance needed to process and store the signals are now commonplace, allowing COHO-like techniques to be applied to any signal. Independent COHO systems are no longer used except in certain classes of low-cost radars.
