= RAF West Beckham =

Former RAF radar station in England

RAF West Beckham
- Part of the Chain Home network
- Located near West Beckham, Norfolk in United Kingdom

Site information
- Type: Radar station
- Code: CH32
- Owner: Air Ministry
- Operator: Royal Air Force
- Controlled by: RAF Fighter Command (No. 12 Group)
- Condition: Closed

Location
- Location within Norfolk
- Coordinates: 52°54′22″N 01°10′52″E
- Area: 10 hectares (25 acres)

Site history
- Built: 1939; 87 years ago
- In use: 1939–1958
- Fate: Site sold for civilian uses (agricultural, residential, and telecommunications)
- Battles/wars: Second World War; Cold War

Royal Air Force West Beckham, commonly known as RAF West Beckham, is a former Chain Home radar station controlled by the Royal Air Force (RAF) located 3.8 miles (6.1 kilometres) south-east of Holt, Norfolk, and 5.3 miles (8.5 kilometres) south-west of Cromer, Norfolk, England.

RAF West Beckham opened in 1939; 87 years ago, and closed in 1958; 68 years ago. The station included a transmitter site, receiver site, generator site, underground reserves, as well as two separate accommodation camps. It was known as Chain Home Station 32, and provided radar coverage for a large area around the North Norfolk coast.

== History ==
During the Second World War, several Women's Auxiliary Air Force (WAAF) personnel were stationed here, and also at B Site 'Marl Pit WAAF camp' located in nearby Bodham. The other accommodation site was known as C Site, home to Royal Norfolk Regiment in 1940, followed by Military Police and then RAF Regiment.

The radar site itself located at West Beckham was known as A Site.

The Station Commander during the Second World War was famous dance band leader Marius B. Winter (1898–1956). Due to his background in the entertainment industry, he was able to get good people in to entertain the people at the camp. Every Sunday night, a dance would be held at B Site, which was popular with the RAF, Army, and locals alike. Winter was at West Beckham from 1942 until 1946. Other Commanding Officers (CO) included Flt Lt Gardner and Flt Lt Ingham before Winter assumed command. During the 1950s, the Commanding Officers were Flt Lt J.H.W. Griffith, Flt Lt T. Bradford, Flt Lt R.W. Chaston, Flt Lt C.A. Brown, Flt Lt Keith Yexley, followed by Flt Lt William R. Jones. Sometime during the late 1940s, there was a Flt Lt Melville in charge. Flt Lt Turpin, an Australian and former Avro Lancaster pilot was a radar officer at the station and sometimes acting CO.

In the 1950s, very few dances were held at the station. However, each Friday night an event known as the Bodham Hop was held in Bodham Village Hall, and was very popular with airmen and local girls alike.

During the war, shift changes at RAF West Beckham were at 08:00, 13:00, and 18:00 hours. During the 1950s, radar at West Beckham was done on a dawn until dusk basis, apart from during the odd exercise when 24 hours coverage was often provided.

After the Second World War, C Site went into care and maintenance. A Site closed in 1956, shortly followed by B Site in 1958. B Site lasted longer as it was also used by personnel from RAF Bard Hill.

The station had close links with the local fighter station RAF Matlaske.

RAF West Beckham reported to the filter room at RAF Watnall, which was the headquarters (HQ) to No. 12 Group RAF during its existence. Originally RAF West Beckham was parented to RAF Bircham Newton, then RAF Wittering, and finally RAF Coltishall. The distance to Bircham Newton, and especially Wittering, proved a major disadvantage with daily trips to Coltishall needed for supplies.

There were four metal transmitter pylon which were 360 feet (110 metres) high, along with four wooden receiver pylons which were 240 feet (73 metres) high. The wooden masts were blown up in the summer of 1957, the metal masts were taken down in late 1957 and early 1958.

== Remains ==
The station perimeter fence lasted until the early 1980s, by when it had almost rusted away.

Today the station is in private ownership, with many of its military buildings still in existence.

== See also ==
- List of former Royal Air Force stations
