= Chain Home =

Radar defence system in Britain in World War II

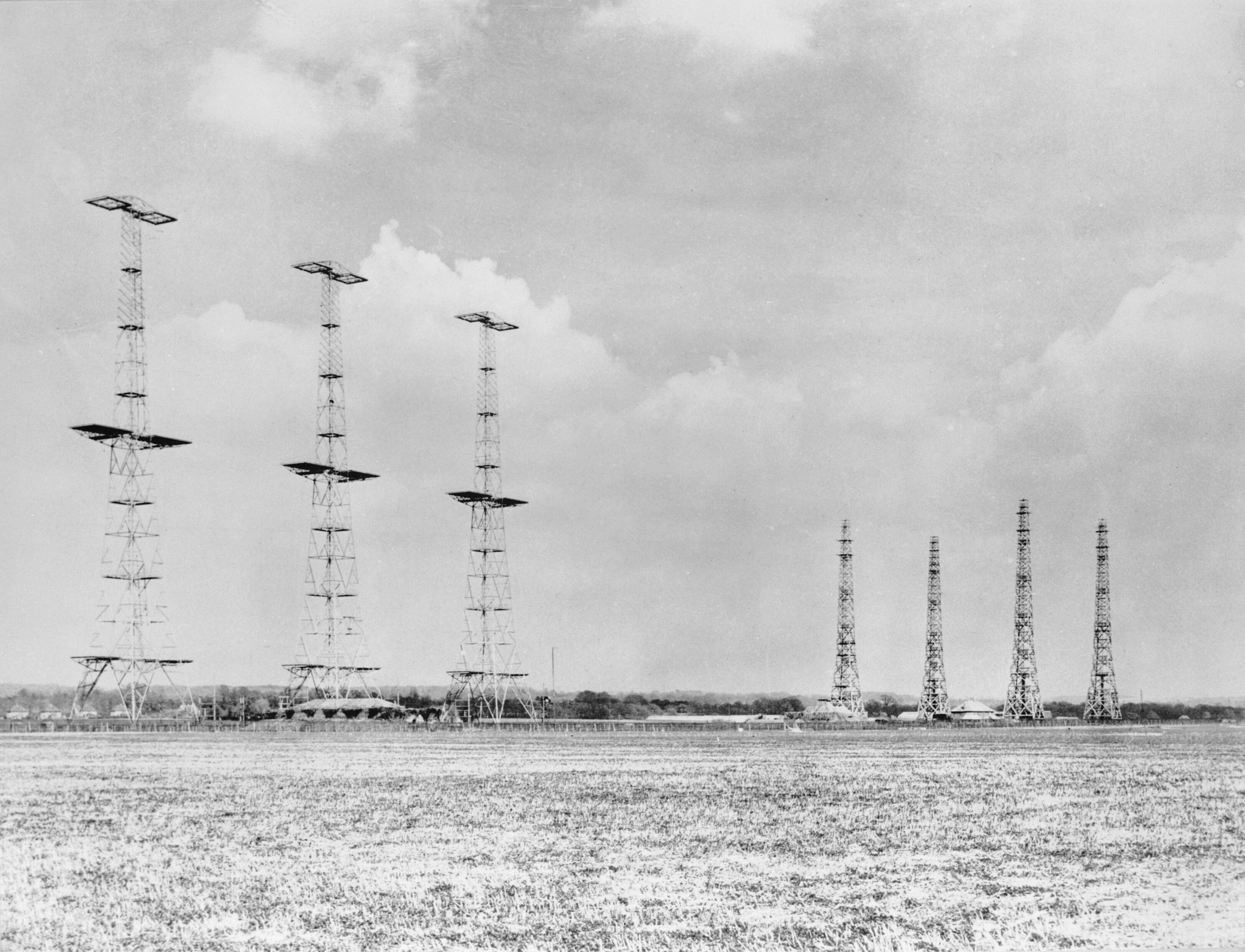
- Chain Home at RAF Poling, West Sussex
- Country of origin: United Kingdom
- Manufacturer: Metropolitan-Vickers, AC Cossor
- Designer: AMES
- Introduced: 1938
- Type: Early warning
- Frequency: Between 20 and 55 MHz
- PRF: 25 pps
- Beamwidth: 150º
- Pulsewidth: 6 to 25 µs
- Range: 100 miles (160 km)
- Azimuth: 150º
- Elevation: 2.5 to 40º
- Precision: 8 kilometres (5.0 mi) or better (1 kilometre (0.62 mi) typical) in range, ±12º in azimuth (typically less)
- Power: 100 kW to 1 MW depending on version
- Other names: RDF, RDF1, AMES Type 1, AMES Type 3, AMES Type 9

Chain Home, or CH for short, was the codename for the ring of coastal early warning radar stations built by the Royal Air Force (RAF) before and during the Second World War to detect and track aircraft. Initially known as RDF, and given the official name Air Ministry Experimental Station Type 1 (AMES Type 1) in 1940, the radar units were also known as Chain Home for most of their life. Chain Home was the first early warning radar network in the world and the first military radar system to reach operational status. Its effect on the war made it one of the most powerful systems of what became known as the "Wizard War".

In late 1934, the Tizard Committee asked radio expert Robert Watson-Watt to comment on the repeated claims of radio death rays and reports suggesting Germany had built some sort of radio weapon. His assistant, Arnold Wilkins, demonstrated that a death ray was impossible but suggested radio could be used for long-range detection. In February 1935, a successful demonstration was arranged by placing a receiver near a BBC short wave transmitter and flying an aircraft around the area. Using commercial short wave radio hardware, Watt's team built a prototype pulsed transmitter and, by June 1935, it detected an aircraft that happened to be flying past. Basic development was completed by the end of the year, with detection ranges on the order of 100 miles (160 km).

In 1936, attention was focused on a production version, and early 1937 saw the addition of height finding. The first five stations, covering the approaches to London, were installed by 1937 and began full-time operation in 1938. Over the next two years, additional stations were built while the problem of disseminating the information to the fighter aircraft led to the first integrated ground-controlled interception network, the Dowding system. (Note: Older works generally refer to the entire network as Chain Home as well, but RAF wartime materials and more modern sources clearly separate the radar network from the reporting chain.) By the time the war started, most of the east and south coasts had radar coverage.

Chain Home proved important during the Battle of Britain in 1940. CH systems could detect enemy aircraft while they were forming over France, giving RAF commanders ample time to marshal their aircraft in the path of the raid. This had the effect of multiplying the effectiveness of the RAF to the point that it was as if they had three times as many fighters, allowing them to defeat frequently larger German forces. The Chain Home network was continually expanded, with over 40 stations operational by the war's end, including mobile versions for use overseas. Late in the war, when the threat of Luftwaffe bombing had ended, the CH systems were used to detect V2 missile launches. UK radar systems were wound down after the war but the start of the Cold War led to the Chain Home radars being pressed into service in the new ROTOR system until replaced by newer systems in the 1950s. Only a few of the original sites remain.

== Development ==
=== Prior experiments ===
From the earliest days of radio technology, signals had been used for navigation using the radio direction finding (RDF) technique. RDF can determine the bearing to a radio transmitter, and several such measurements can be combined to produce a radio fix, allowing the receiver's position to be calculated. Given some basic changes to the broadcast signal, it was possible for the receiver to determine its location using a single station. The UK pioneered one such service in the form of the Orfordness Beacon.

Through the early period of radio development it was widely known that certain materials, especially metal, reflected radio signals. This led to the possibility of determining the location of objects by broadcasting a signal and then using RDF to measure the bearing of any reflections. Such a system saw patents issued to Germany's Christian Hülsmeyer in 1904, and widespread experimentation with the basic concept was carried out from then on. These systems revealed only the bearing to the target, not the range, and due to the low power of radio equipment of that era, they were useful only for short-range detection. This led to their use for iceberg and collision warning in fog or bad weather, where all that was required was the rough bearing of nearby objects.

The use of radio detection specifically against aircraft was first considered in the early 1930s. Teams in the UK, US, Japan, Germany and others had all considered this concept and put at least some amount of effort into developing it. Lacking ranging information, such systems remained of limited use in practical terms; two angle measurements could be used, but these took time to complete using existing RDF equipment and the rapid movement of the aircraft during the measurement would make coordination difficult.

=== Radio research in the UK ===
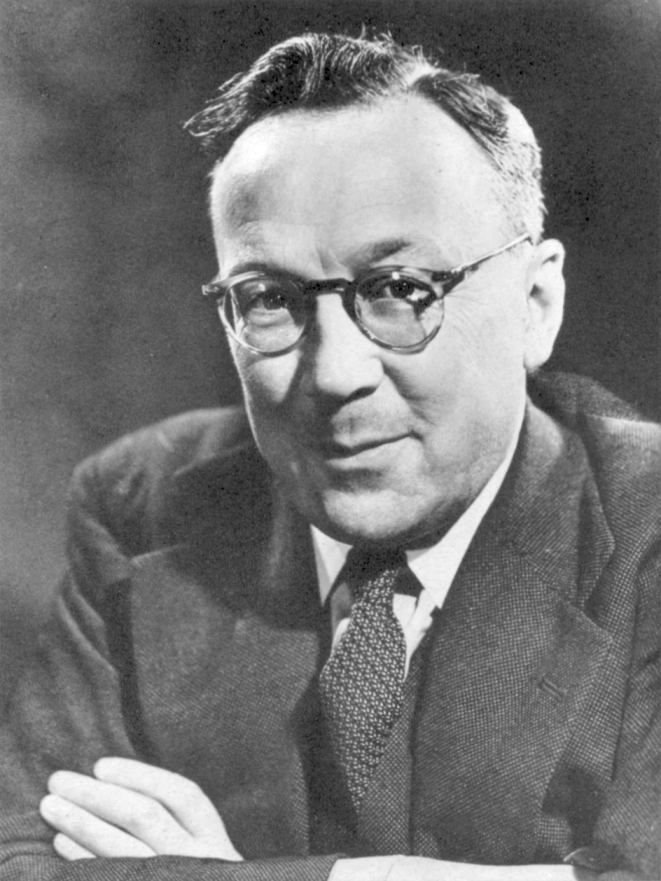
Robert Watson-Watt's position with the National Physical Laboratory placed him at the centre of a network of researchers whose knowledge of radio physics was instrumental to the rapid development of radar.

Since 1915, Robert Watson-Watt had been working for the Met Office in a lab that was colocated at the National Physical Laboratory's (NPL) Radio Research Section (RRS) at Ditton Park in Slough. Watt became interested in using the fleeting radio signals given off by lightning as a way to track thunderstorms, but existing RDF techniques were too slow to allow the direction to be determined before the signal disappeared. In 1922, he solved this by connecting a cathode-ray tube (CRT) to a directional Adcock antenna array, originally built by the RRS but now unused. The combined system, later known as huff-duff (from HF/DF, high frequency direction finding), allowed the almost instantaneous determination of the bearing of a signal. The Met Office began using it to produce storm warnings for aviators.

During this period, Edward Appleton of King's College, Cambridge was carrying out experiments that would lead to him winning the Nobel Prize in Physics. Using a BBC transmitter set up in 1923 in Bournemouth and listening for its signal with a receiver at Oxford University, he was able to use changes in wavelength to measure the distance to a reflective layer in the atmosphere then known as the Heaviside layer. After the initial experiments at Oxford, an NPL transmitter at Teddington was used as a source, received by Appleton in an out-station of King's College in the East End of London. Watt learned of these experiments and began conducting the same measurements using his team's receivers in Slough. From then on, the two teams interacted regularly and Watt coined the term ionosphere to describe the multiple atmospheric layers they discovered.

In 1927 the two radio labs, at the Met Office and NPL, were combined to form the Radio Research Station (with the same acronym, RRS), run by the NPL with Watt as the Superintendent. This provided Watt with direct contact to the research community, as well as the chief signals officers of the British Army, Royal Navy and Royal Air Force. Watt became a well-known expert in the field of radio technology. This began a long period where Watt agitated for the NPL to take a more active role in technology development, as opposed to its pure research role. Watt was particularly interested in the use of radio for long-range aircraft navigation, but the NPL management at Teddington was not receptive and these proposals went nowhere.

=== Detection of aircraft ===
In 1931, Arnold Frederic Wilkins joined Watt's staff in Slough. As the "new boy", he was given a variety of menial tasks to complete. One of these was to select a new shortwave receiver for ionospheric studies, a task he undertook with great seriousness. After reading everything available on several units, he selected a model from the General Post Office (GPO) that worked at (for that time) very high frequencies. As part of their tests of this system, in June 1932 the GPO published a report, No. 232 Interference by Aeroplanes. The report recounted the GPO testing team's observation that aircraft flying near the receiver caused the signal to change in intensity, an annoying effect known as fading.

The stage was now set for the development of radar in the UK. Using Wilkins' knowledge that shortwave signals bounced off aircraft, a BBC transmitter to light up the sky as in Appleton's experiment, and Watt's RDF technique to measure angles, a complete radar could be built. While such a system could determine the angle to a target, it could not determine its range and provide a location in space. To do so, two such measurements would have to be made from different locations. Watt's huff-duff technique solved the problem of making rapid measurements, but the issue of coordinating the measurement at two stations remained, as did any inaccuracies in measurement or differences in calibration between the two stations.

The missing technique that made radar practical was the use of pulses to determine range by measuring the time between the transmission of the signal and reception of the reflected signal. This would allow a single station to measure angle and range simultaneously. In 1924, two researchers at the Naval Research Laboratory in the United States, Merle Tuve and Gregory Briet, decided to recreate Appleton's experiment using timed pulsed signals instead of the changing wavelengths. The application of this technique to a detection system was not lost on those working in the field, and such a system was prototyped by W. A. S. Butement and P. E. Pollard of the British Signals Experimental Establishment (SEE) in 1931. The War Office proved uninterested in the concept and the development remained little known outside SEE.

=== "The bomber will always get through" ===
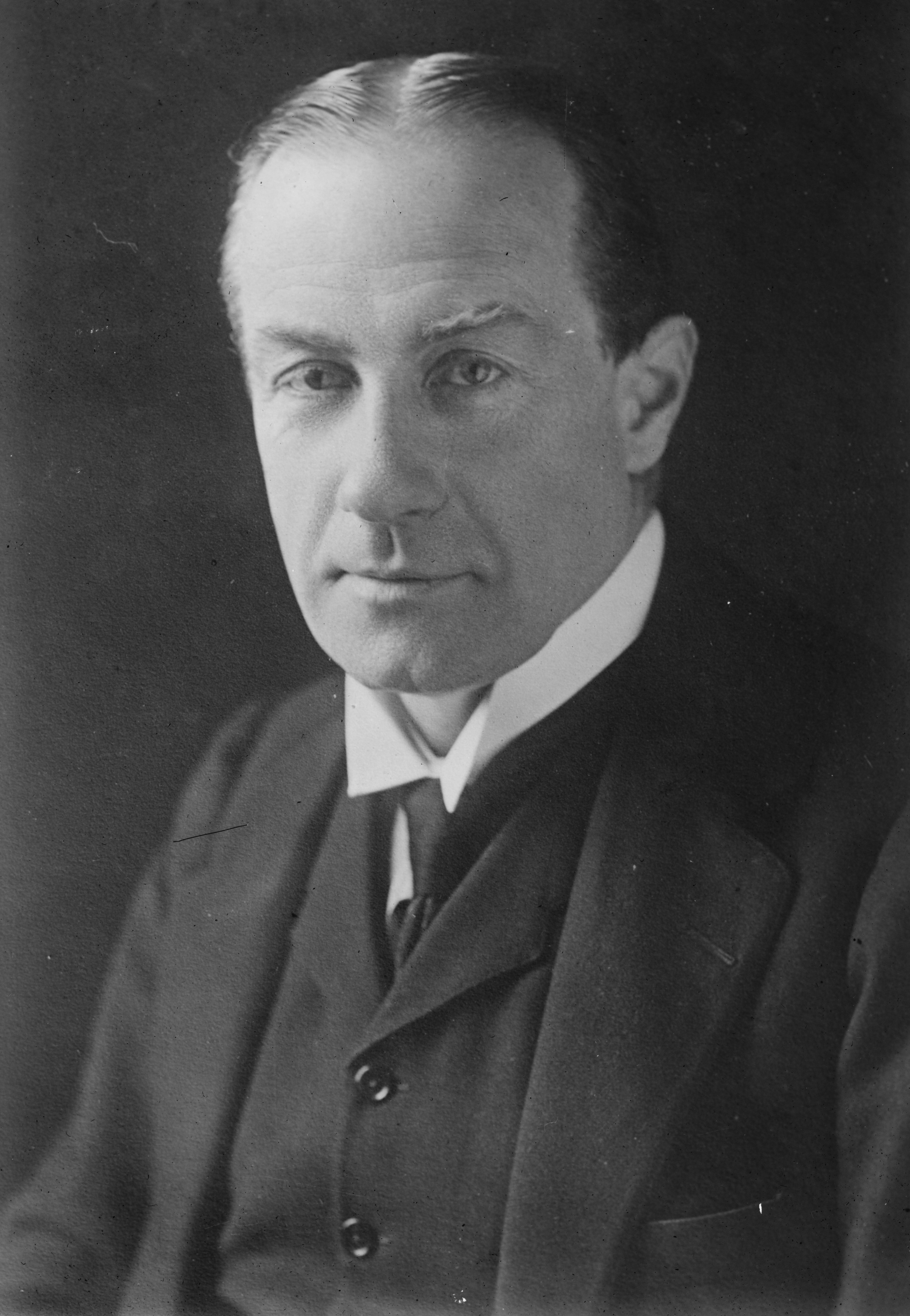
Stanley Baldwin's 1932 comments on future aerial warfare led to a "feeling of defencelessness and dismay." It was the UK's concern about this issue that led to so much support being given to radar development while other countries had a much more lackadaisical approach until the war started.

At the same time, the need for such a system was becoming increasingly pressing. In 1932, Winston Churchill and his friend, confidant and scientific advisor Frederick Lindemann travelled by car in Europe, where they saw the rapid rebuilding of the German aircraft industry. It was in November of that year that Stanley Baldwin gave his famous speech, stating that "The bomber will always get through".

In the early summer of 1934, the RAF carried out large-scale exercises with up to 350 aircraft. The forces were split, with bombers attempting to attack London, while fighters, guided by the Observer Corps, attempted to stop them. The results were dismal. In most cases, the vast majority of the bombers reached their target without ever seeing a fighter. To address the one-sided results, the RAF gave increasingly accurate information to the defenders, eventually telling the observers where and when the attacks would be taking place. Even then, 70 per cent of the bombers reached their targets unhindered. The numbers suggested any targets in the city would be destroyed. Squadron Leader P. R. Burchall summed up the results by noting that "a feeling of defencelessness and dismay, or at all events of uneasiness, has seized the public." In November, Churchill gave a speech on "The threat of Nazi Germany" in which he pointed out that the Royal Navy could not protect Britain from an enemy who attacked by air.

Through the early 1930s, a debate raged within British military and political circles about strategic airpower. Baldwin's famous speech led many to believe the only way to prevent the bombing of British cities was to make a strategic bomber force so large it could, as Baldwin put it, "kill more women and children more quickly than the enemy." Even the highest levels of the RAF came to agree with this policy, publicly stating that their tests suggested that "'The best form of defence is attack' may be all-too-familiar platitudes, but they illustrate the only sound method of defending this country from air invasion. It is attack that counts." As it became clear the Germans were rapidly rearming the Luftwaffe, the fear grew RAF could not meet the objective of winning such a tit-for-tat exchange and many suggested they invest in a massive bomber building exercise.

Others felt advances in fighters meant the bomber was increasingly vulnerable and suggested at least exploring a defensive approach. Among the latter group was Lindemann, test pilot and scientist, who noted in The Times in August 1934 that "To adopt a defeatist attitude in the face of such a threat is inexcusable until it has definitely been shown that all the resources of science and invention have been exhausted."

=== Tales of destructive "rays" ===
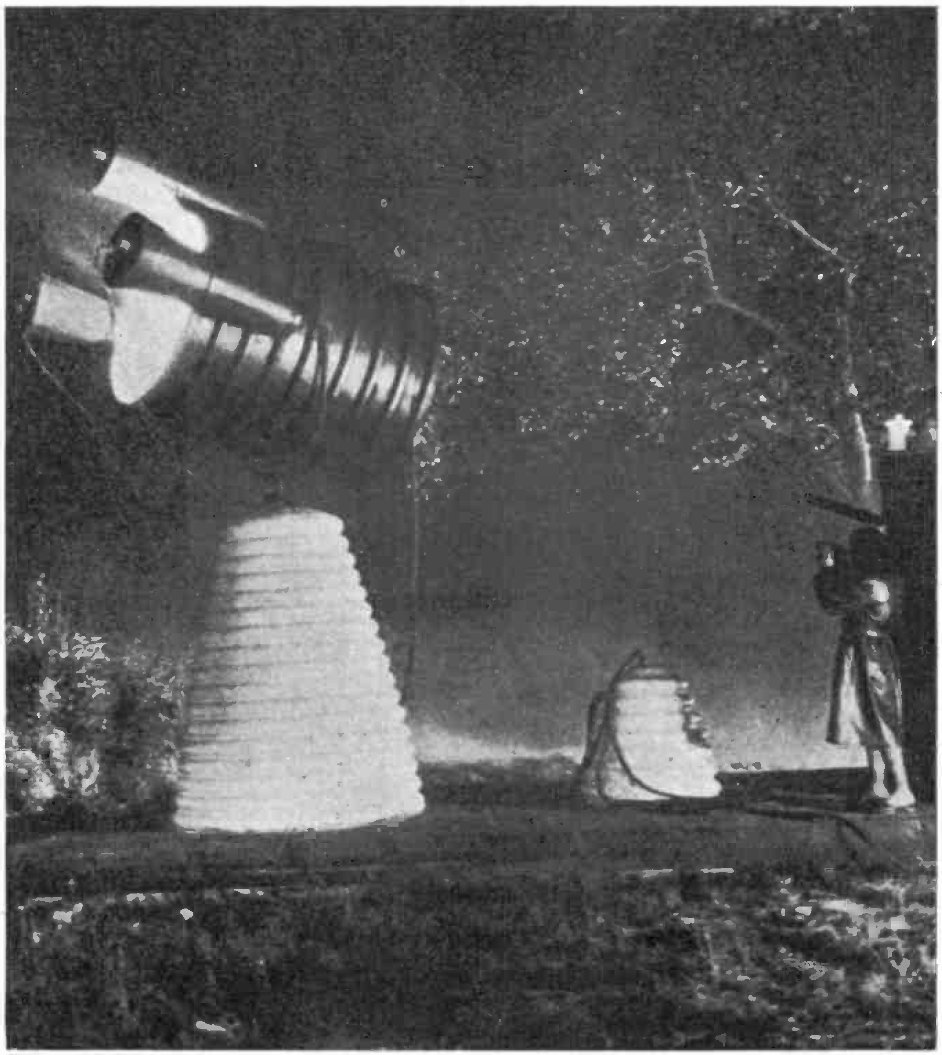
A 1925 radio magazine photograph of Grindell-Matthews' death ray

In 1923–24 inventor Harry Grindell Matthews repeatedly claimed to have built a device that projected energy over long ranges and attempted to sell it to the War Office, but it was deemed to be fraudulent. His attempts spurred on many other inventors to contact the British military with claims of having perfected some form of the fabled electric or radio "death ray". Some turned out to be frauds and none turned out to be feasible.

Around the same time, a series of stories suggested another radio weapon was being developed in Germany. The stories varied, with one common thread being a death ray, and another that used the signals to interfere with an engine's ignition system to cause the engine to stall. One commonly repeated story involved an English couple who were driving in the Black Forest on holiday and had their car fail in the countryside. They claimed they were approached by soldiers who told them to wait while they conducted a test, and were then able to start their engine without trouble when the test was complete. This was followed shortly thereafter by a story in a German newspaper with an image of a large radio antenna that had been installed on Feldberg in the same area.

Although highly skeptical about claims of engine-stopping rays and death rays, the Air Ministry could not ignore them as they were theoretically possible. If such systems could be built, it might render bombers useless. If this were to happen, the night bomber deterrent might evaporate overnight, leaving the UK open to attack by Germany's ever-growing air fleet. Conversely, if the UK had such a device, the population could be protected.

In 1934, along with a movement to establish a scientific committee to examine these new types of weapons, the RAF offered a £1,000 prize to anyone who could demonstrate a working model of a death ray that could kill a sheep at 100 yards; it went unclaimed.

=== Tizard committee ===
The need to research better forms of air defense prompted Harry Wimperis (Note: Bowen suggests Tizard was the original impetus for the formation of the Committee and had approached Wimperis to back him up.) to press for the formation of a study group to consider new concepts. Lord Londonderry, then Secretary of State for Air, approved the formation of the Committee for the Scientific Survey of Air Defence in November 1934, asking Henry Tizard to chair the group, which thus became better known to history as the Tizard Committee.

When Wimperis sought an expert in radio to help judge the death-ray concept, he was naturally directed to Watt. He wrote to Watt "on the practicability of proposals of the type colloquially called 'death ray'". The two met on 18 January 1935, and Watt promised to look into the matter. Watt turned to Wilkins for help but wanted to keep the underlying question a secret. He asked Wilkins to calculate what sort of radio energy would be needed to raise the temperature of 8 imperial pints (4.5 L) of water at a distance of 5 kilometres (3.1 mi) from 98 to 105 °F (37 to 41 °C). To Watt's bemusement, Wilkins immediately surmised this was a question about a death ray. He made a number of back-of-the-envelope calculations demonstrating the amount of energy needed would be impossible given the state of the art in electronics.

According to R. V. Jones, when Wilkins reported the negative results, Watt asked, "Well then, if the death ray is not possible, how can we help them?" Wilkins recalled the earlier report from the GPO, and noted that the wingspan of a contemporary bomber aircraft, about 25 m (82 ft), would be just right to form a half-wavelength dipole antenna for signals in the range of 50 m wavelength, or about 6 MHz. In theory, this would efficiently reflect the signal and could be picked up by a receiver to give an early indication of approaching aircraft.

=== "Less unpromising" ===
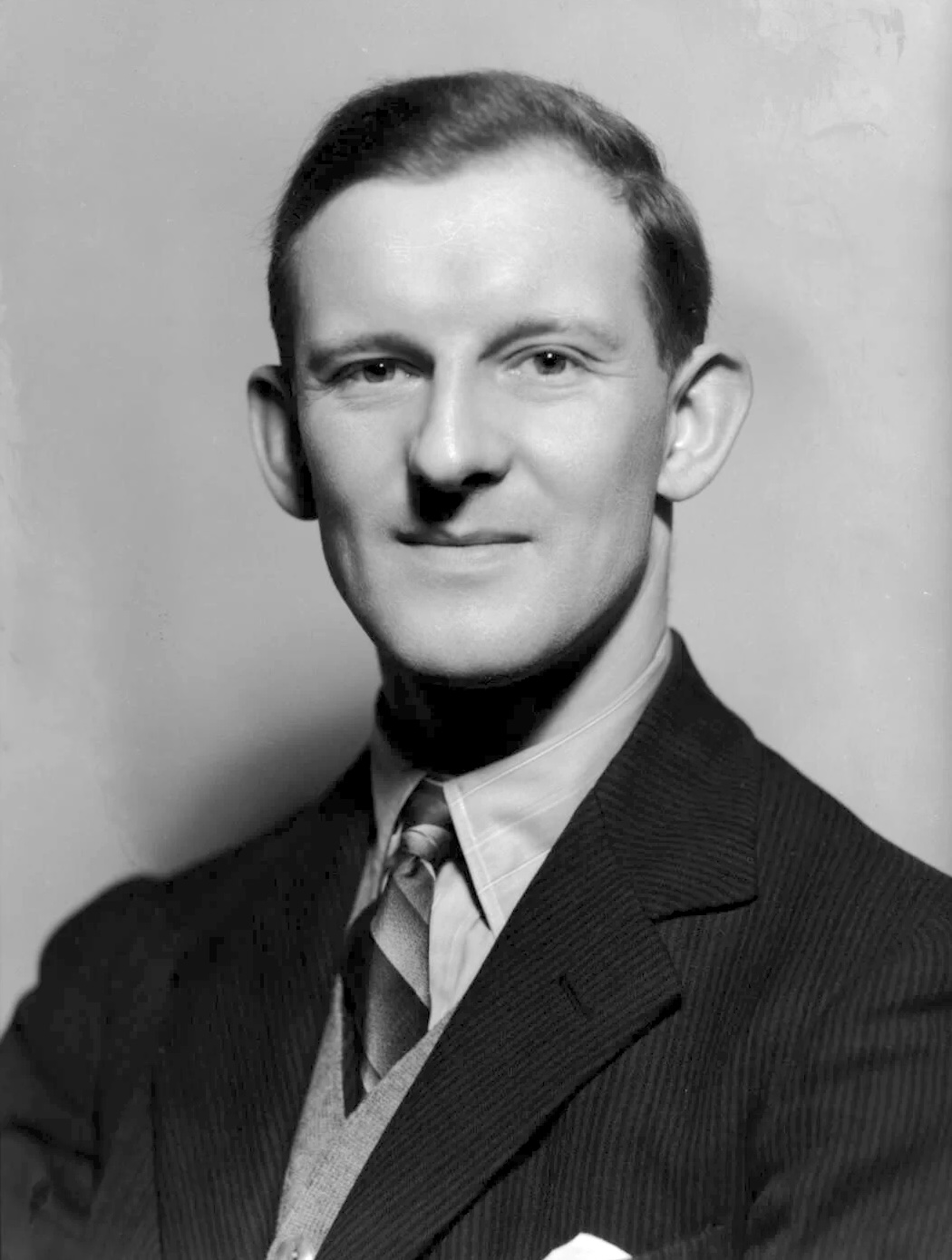
Arnold Wilkins carried out most of the theoretical and practical work that proved radar could work.

Watt wrote back to the committee saying the death ray was extremely unlikely, but added:

Attention is being turned to the still difficult, but less unpromising, problem of radio detection and numerical considerations on the method of detection by reflected radio waves will be submitted when required.

The letter was discussed at the first official meeting of the Tizard Committee on 28 January 1935. The utility of the concept was evident to all attending, but the question remained whether it was actually possible. Albert Rowe and Wimperis both checked the maths and it appeared to be correct. They immediately wrote back asking for a more detailed consideration. Watt and Wilkins followed up with a 14 February secret memo entitled Detection and Location of Aircraft by Radio Means. In the new memo, Watson-Watt and Wilkins first considered various natural emanations from the aircraft – light, heat and radio waves from the engine ignition system – and demonstrated that these were too easy for the enemy to mask to a level that would be undetectable at reasonable ranges. They concluded that radio waves from their own transmitter would be needed.

Wilkins gave specific calculations for the expected reflectivity of an aircraft. The received signal would be only 10^{−19} times as strong as the transmitted one, but such sensitivity was considered to be within the state of the art. To reach this goal, a further improvement in receiver sensitivity of two times was assumed. Their ionospheric systems broadcast only about 1 kW, but commercial shortwave systems were available with 15 amp transmitters (about 10 kW) that they calculated would produce a signal detectable at about 10 miles (16 km). They went on to suggest that the output power could be increased as much as ten times if the system operated in pulses instead of continuously, and that such a system would have the advantage of allowing range to the targets to be determined by measuring the time delay between transmission and reception on an oscilloscope. The rest of the required performance would be made up by increasing the gain of the antennas by making them very tall, focusing the signal vertically. The memo concluded with an outline for a complete station using these techniques. The design was almost identical to the CH stations that went into service.

=== Daventry experiment ===
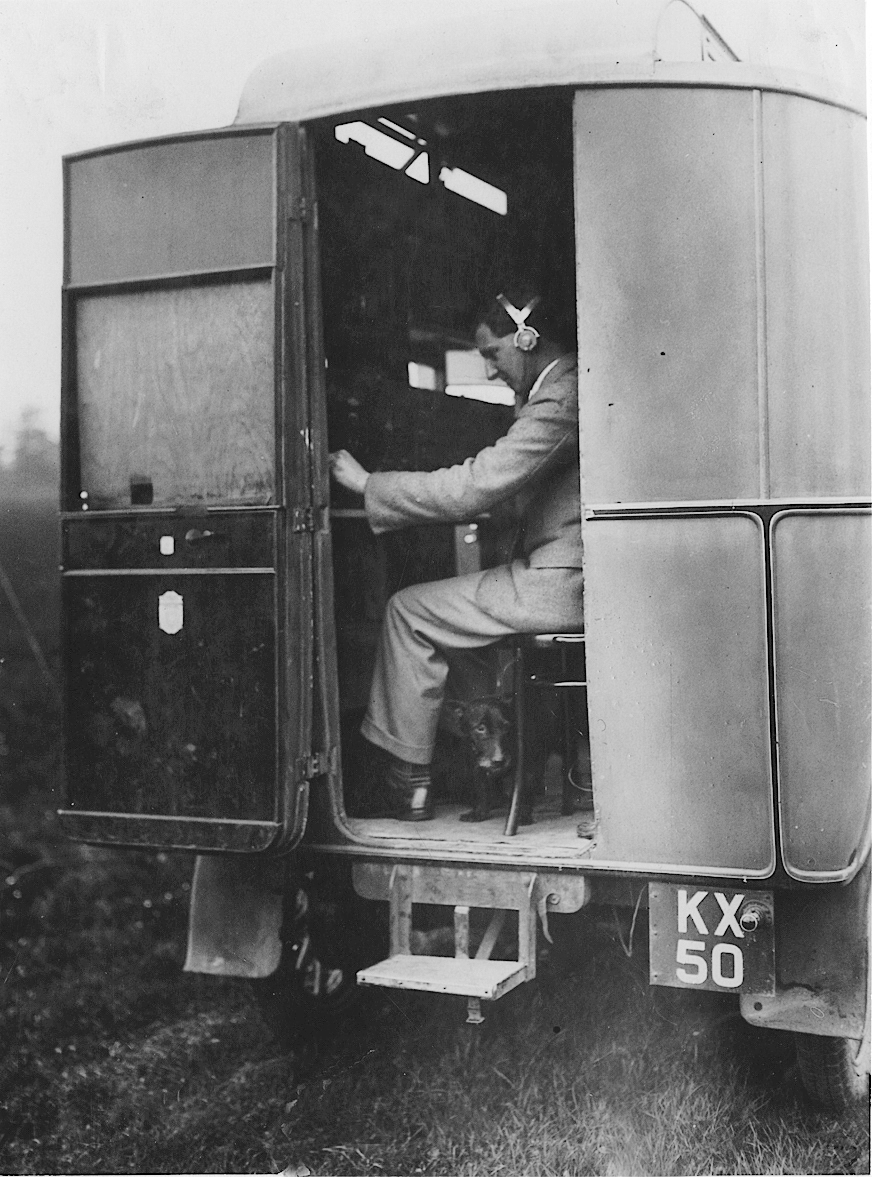
This Morris Commercial T-type van, originally used as a portable radio reception testbed, was later refitted for the Daventry Experiment. It is shown in 1933, being operated by "Jock" Herd.

The letter was seized on by the Committee, who immediately released £4,000 to begin development. (Note: Some sources say £2,000.) They petitioned Hugh Dowding, the Air Member for Supply and Research, to ask the Treasury for another £10,000. Dowding was extremely impressed with the concept, but demanded a practical demonstration before further funding was released.

Wilkins suggested using the new 10 kW, 49.8 m BBC Borough Hill shortwave station in Daventry, Northamptonshire as a suitable ad hoc transmitter. The receiver and an oscilloscope were placed in a delivery van the RRS used for measuring radio reception around the countryside. On 26 February 1935, (Note: This, coincidentally, was the same day Hitler officially created the Luftwaffe.) they parked the van in a field near Upper Stowe and connected it to wire antennas stretched across the field on top of wooden poles. A Handley Page Heyford made four passes over the area, producing clearly notable effects on the CRT display on three of the passes. A memorial stone was placed at the site of the test.

Observing the test were Watt, Wilkins, and several other members of the RRS team, along with Rowe representing the Tizard Committee. Watt was so impressed he later claimed to have exclaimed: "Britain has become an island again!"

Rowe and Dowding were equally impressed. It was at this point that Watt's previous agitation over development became important; NPL management remained uninterested in practical development of the concept, and was happy to allow the Air Ministry to take over the team. Days later, the Treasury released £12,300 for further development, and a small team of the RRS researchers were sworn to secrecy and began developing the concept. A system was to be built at the RRS station, and then moved to Orfordness for over-water testing. Wilkins would develop the receiver based on the GPO units, along with suitable antenna systems. This left the problem of developing a suitable pulsed transmitter. An engineer familiar with these concepts was needed.

=== Experimental system ===
Edward George Bowen joined the team after responding to a newspaper advertisement looking for a radio expert. Bowen had previously worked on ionosphere studies under Appleton, and was well acquainted with the basic concepts. He had also used the RRS' RDF systems at Appleton's request and was known to the RRS staff. After a breezy interview, Watson-Watt and Jock Herd stated the job was his if he could sing the Welsh national anthem. He agreed, but only if they would sing the Scottish one in return. They declined, and gave him the job.

Starting with the BBC transmitter electronics, but using a new transmitter valve from the Navy, Bowen produced a system that transmitted a 25 kW signal at 6 MHz (50 metre wavelength), sending out 25 μs long pulses 25 times a second. Meanwhile, Wilkins and L.H. Bainbridge-Bell built a receiver based on electronics from Ferranti and one of the RRS CRTs. They decided not to assemble the system at the RRS for secrecy reasons. The team, now consisting of three scientific officers and six assistants, began moving the equipment to Orfordness on 13 May 1935. The receiver and transmitter were set up in old huts left over from World War I artillery experiments, the transmitter antenna was a single dipole strung horizontally between two 75 foot (23 m) poles, and the receiver a similar arrangement of two crossed wires.

The system showed little success against aircraft, although echoes from the ionosphere as far as 1,000 miles away were noted. The group released several reports on these effects as a cover story, claiming that their ionospheric studies had been interfering with the other experiments at the RRS at Slough, and expressing their gratitude that the Air Ministry had granted them access to unused land at Orfordness to continue their efforts. Bowen continued increasing the voltage in the transmitter, starting with the 5000 volt maximum suggested by the Navy, but increasing in steps over several months to 12,000 V, which produced pulses of 200 kW. Arcing between the valves required the transmitter to be rebuilt with more room between them, while arcing on the antenna was solved by hanging copper balls from the dipole to reduce corona discharge.

By June the system was working well, although Bainbridge-Bell proved to be so skeptical of success that Watt eventually returned him to the RRS and replaced him with Nick Carter. The Tizard Committee visited the site on 15 June to examine the team's progress. Watt secretly arranged for a Vickers Valentia to fly nearby, and years later insisted that he saw the echoes on the display, but no one else recalls seeing these.

Watt decided not to return to the RRS with the rest of the Tizard group and stayed with the team for another day. With no changes made to the equipment, on 17 June the system was turned on and immediately provided returns from an object at 17 miles (27 km). After tracking it for some time, they watched it fly off to the south and disappear. Watt phoned the nearby Seaplane Experimental Station at Felixstowe and the superintendent stated that a Supermarine Scapa flying boat had just landed. Watt requested the aircraft return to make more passes. This event is considered the official birth date of radar in the UK.

Aircraft from RAF Martlesham Heath took over the job of providing targets for the system, and the range was continually pushed out. During a 24 July test, the receiver detected a target at 40 miles (64 km) and the signal was strong enough that they could determine the target was actually three aircraft in close formation. By September the range was consistently 40 miles, increasing to 80 miles (130 km) by the end of the year, and with the power improvements Bowen worked into the transmitter, was over 100 miles (160 km) by early 1936.

=== Planning the chain ===
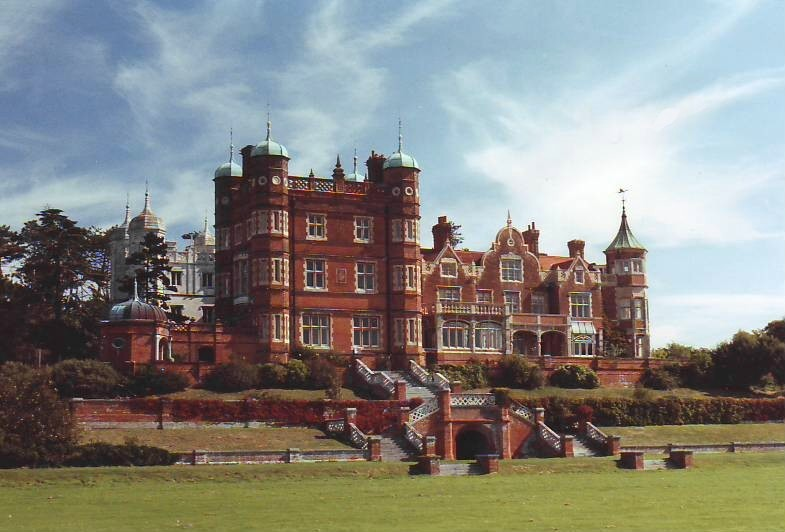
Watson-Watt suggested using Bawdsey Manor in Suffolk as a development site, after Wilkins noticed it on a Sunday drive while working a short distance to the north at Orfordness.

In August 1935, Albert Rowe, secretary of the Tizard Committee, coined the term "Radio Direction and Finding" (RDF), deliberately choosing a name that could be confused with "Radio Direction Finding", a term already in widespread use.

In a 9 September 1935 memo, Watson-Watt outlined the progress to date. At that time the range was about 40 miles (64 km), so Watson-Watt suggested building a complete network of stations 20 miles (32 km) apart along the entire east coast. Since the transmitters and receivers were separate, to save development costs he suggested placing a transmitter at every other station. The transmitter signal could be used by a receiver at that site as well as the ones on each side of it. This was quickly rendered moot by the rapid increases in range. When the Committee next visited the site in October, the range was up to 80 miles (130 km), and Wilkins was working on a method for height finding using multiple antennas.

In spite of its ad hoc nature and short development time of less than six months, the Orfordness system had already become a useful and practical system. In comparison, the acoustic mirror systems that had been in development for a decade were still limited to only 5 miles (8.0 km) range under most conditions, and were very difficult to use in practice. Work on mirror systems ended, and on 19 December 1935, a £60,000 contract (Note: Bowen puts the sum at £1,000,000.) for five (Note: Gough says seven) RDF stations along the south-east coast was sent out, to be operational by August 1936.

The only person not convinced of the utility of RDF was Lindemann. He had been placed on the Committee at the insistence of his friend, Churchill, and proved unimpressed with the team's work. When he visited the site, he was upset by the crude conditions, and apparently, by the box lunch he had to eat. Lindemann strongly advocated the use of infrared systems for detection and tracking and numerous observers have noted Lindemann's continual interference with radar. As Bowen put it,

Within a few months of his joining the Committee, what had previously been an innovative and forward-looking group became riven with strife. It was strictly Lindemann versus the rest, with his hostility to radar and his insistence on totally impractical ideas about intercepting enemy aircraft by means of wires dangled from balloons, or by infrared, which at that time simply did not have the sensitivity to detect aircraft at long range.

Churchill's backing meant the other members' complaints about his behaviour were ignored. The matter was eventually referred back to Lord Swinton, the new Secretary of State for Air. Swinton solved the problem by dissolving the original Committee and reforming it with Appleton in Lindemann's place.

As the development effort grew, Watt requested a central research station be established "of large size and with ground space for a considerable number of mast and aerial systems". Several members of the team went on scouting trips with Watt to the north of Orfordness but found nothing suitable. Then Wilkins recalled having come across an interesting site about 10 miles (16 km) south of Orfordness, some time earlier while on a Sunday drive. He recalled it because it was some 70–80 feet (21–24 m) above sea level, which was unusual in that area. The large manor house on the property would have ample room for experimental labs and offices. In February and March 1936, the team moved to Bawdsey Manor and established the Air Ministry Experimental Station (AMES). When the scientific team left in 1939, the site became the operational CH site RAF Bawdsey.

While the "ness team" began moving to Bawdsey, the Orfordness site remained in use. This proved useful during one demonstration when the new system recently completed at Bawdsey failed. The next day, Robert Hanbury-Brown and the new recruit Gerald Touch started up the Orfordness system and were able to run the demonstrations from there. The Orfordness site was not closed until 1937.

=== Into production ===
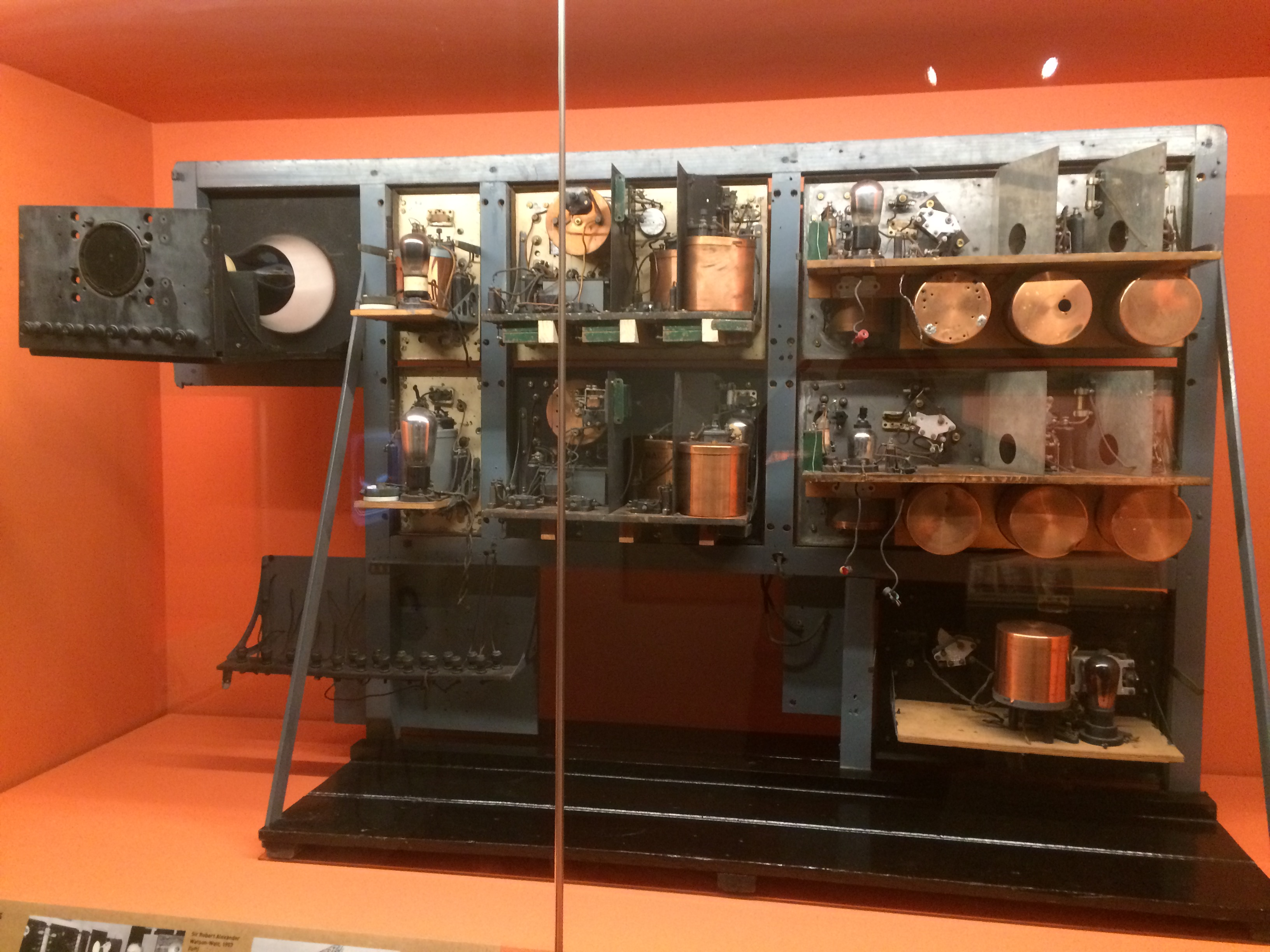
The first working radar unit constructed by Watson-Watt and his team. The four widely separated NT46 valves can be seen. Production units were largely identical.

The system was deliberately developed using existing commercially available technology to speed introduction. The development team could not afford the time to develop and debug new technology. Watt, a pragmatic engineer, believed "third-best" would do if "second-best" would not be available in time and "best" never available at all. This led to the use of the 50 m wavelength (around 6 MHz), which Wilkins suggested would resonate in a bomber's wings and improve the signal. Unfortunately, this also meant that the system was increasingly blanketed by noise as new commercial broadcasts began taking up this formerly high-frequency spectrum. The team responded by reducing their own wavelength to 26 m (around 11 MHz) to get clear spectrum. To everyone's delight, and contrary to Wilkins' 1935 calculations, the shorter wavelength produced no loss of performance. This led to a further reduction to 13 m, and finally the ability to tune between 10 and 13 m, (roughly 30-20 MHz) to provide some frequency agility to help avoid jamming.

Wilkins' method of height-finding was added in 1937. He had originally developed this system as a way to measure the vertical angle of transatlantic broadcasts while working at the RRS. The system consisted of several parallel dipoles separated vertically on the receiver masts. Normally the RDF goniometer was connected to two crossed dipoles at the same height and used to determine the bearing to a target return. For height finding, the operator instead connected two antennas at different heights and carried out the same basic operation to determine the vertical angle. Because the transmitter antenna was deliberately focused vertically to improve gain, a single pair of such antennas would only cover a thin vertical angle. A series of such antennas was used, each pair with a different centre angle, providing continuous coverage from about 2.5 degrees over the horizon to as much as 40 degrees above it. With this addition, the final remaining piece of Watt's original memo was accomplished and the system was ready to go into production.

Industry partners were canvassed in early 1937, and a production network was organized covering many companies. Metropolitan-Vickers took over design and production of the transmitters, AC Cossor did the same for the receivers, the Radio Transmission Equipment Company worked on the goniometers, and the antennas were designed by a joint AMES-GPO group. The Treasury gave approval for full-scale deployment in August, and the first production contracts were sent out for 20 sets in November, at a total cost of £380,000. Installation of 15 of these sets was carried out in 1937 and 1938. In June 1938 a London headquarters was established to organize the rapidly growing force. This became the Directorate of Communications Development (DCD), with Watt named as the director. Wilkins followed him to the DCD, and A. P. Rowe took over AMES at Bawdsey. In August 1938, the first five stations were declared operational and entered service during the Munich crisis, starting full-time operation in September.

=== Deployment ===
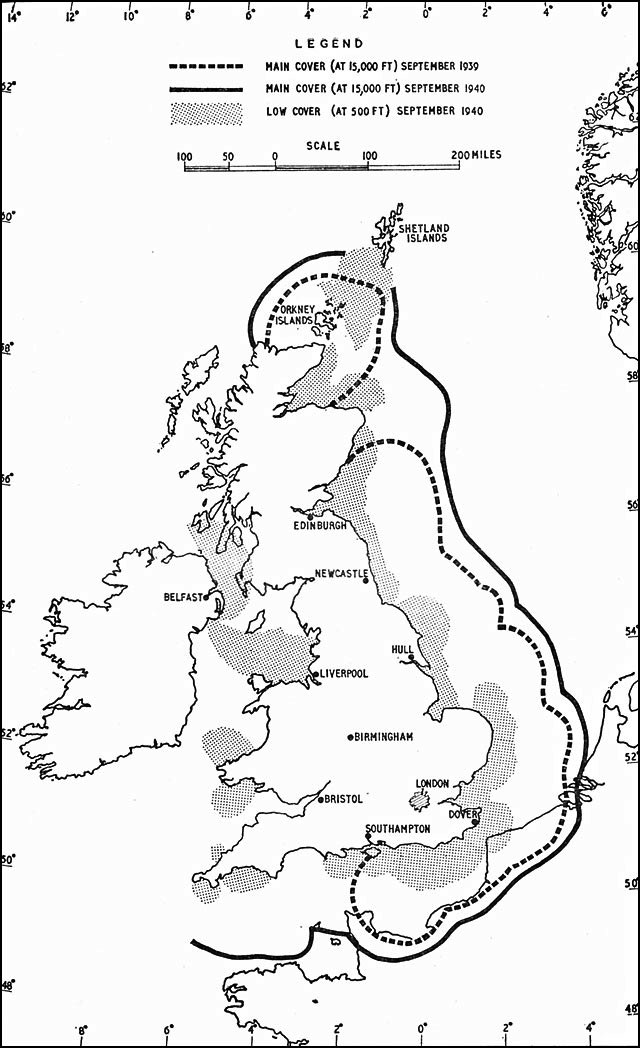
Radar coverage 1939–1940

During the summer of 1936, experiments were carried out at RAF Biggin Hill to examine what effect the presence of radar would have on an air battle. Assuming RDF would provide them 15 minutes' warning, they developed interception techniques putting fighters in front of the bombers with increasing efficiency. They found the main problems were finding their own aircraft's location, and ensuring the fighters were at the right altitude.

In a similar test against the operational radar at Bawdsey in 1937, the results were comical. As Dowding watched the ground controllers scramble to direct their fighters, he could hear the bombers passing overhead. He identified the problem not as a technological one, but in the reporting. The pilots were being sent too many reports, often contradictory. This realization led to the development of the Dowding system, an extensive network of telephone lines reporting to a central "filter room" in London where the reports from the radar stations were collected and collated, and fed back to the pilots in a clear format. The system as a whole was enormously manpower intensive.

By the outbreak of war in September 1939, there were 21 operational Chain Home stations. After the Battle of France in 1940 the network was expanded to cover the west coast and Northern Ireland. The Chain continued to be expanded throughout the war, and by 1940 it stretched from Orkney in the north to Weymouth in the south. This provided radar coverage for the entire Europe-facing side of the British Isles, able to detect high-flying targets well over France. Calibration of the system was carried out initially using a flight of mostly civilian-flown, impressed Avro Rota autogyros flying over a known landmark, the radar then being calibrated so that the position of a target relative to the ground could be read off the CRT. The Rota was used because of its ability to maintain a relatively stationary position over the ground, the pilots learning to fly in small circles while remaining at a constant ground position, despite a headwind.

The rapid expansion of the CH network necessitated more technical and operational personnel than the UK could provide, and in 1940, a formal request was made by the British High Commission, Ottawa to the Canadian Government, appealing for men skilled in radio technology for the service of the defence of Great Britain. By the end of 1941, 1,292 trained personnel had enlisted and most were rushed to England to serve as radar mechanics.

=== Battle of Britain ===
During the battle, Chain Home stations – most notably the one at Ventnor, Isle of Wight – were attacked several times between 12 and 18 August 1940. On one occasion a section of the radar chain in Kent, including the Dover CH, was put out of action by a lucky hit on the power grid. Though the wooden huts housing the radar equipment were damaged, the towers survived owing to their open steel girder construction. Because the towers survived intact and the signals were soon restored, the Luftwaffe concluded the stations were too difficult to damage by bombing and left them alone for the remainder of the war.

=== Upgrades ===
Chain Home was the primary radar system of the UK for only a short time. By 1942, many of its duties had been taken over by the far more advanced AMES Type 7 ground-controlled interception (GCI) radar systems. Whereas CH scanned an area perhaps 100 degrees wide and required considerable effort to take measurements, the Type 7 scanned the entire 360-degree area around the station, and presented it on a plan position indicator, essentially a real-time two-dimensional map of the airspace around the station. Both fighters and bombers appeared on the display, and could be distinguished using Identification friend or foe (IFF) signals. The data from this display could be read directly to the intercepting pilots, without the need for additional operators or control centres.

With the deployment of GCI, CH became the early warning portion of the radar network. To further simplify operations and reduce manpower requirements, the job of plotting the targets became semi-automated. An analogue computer of some complexity, known as "The Fruit Machine", was fed information directly from the operator console, reading the goniometer setting for bearing, and the range from the setting of a dial that moved a mechanical pointer along the screen until it lay over a selected target. When a button was pushed, the Fruit Machine read the inputs and calculated the X and Y location of the target, which a single operator could then plot on a map, or relay directly over the telephone.

The original transmitters were constantly upgraded, first from 100 kW of the Orfordness system to 350 kW for the deployed system, and then again to 750 kW during the war in order to offer greatly increased range. To aid in detection at long range, a slower 12.5 pulse per second rate was added. The four-tower transmitter was later reduced to three towers.

=== Big Ben ===
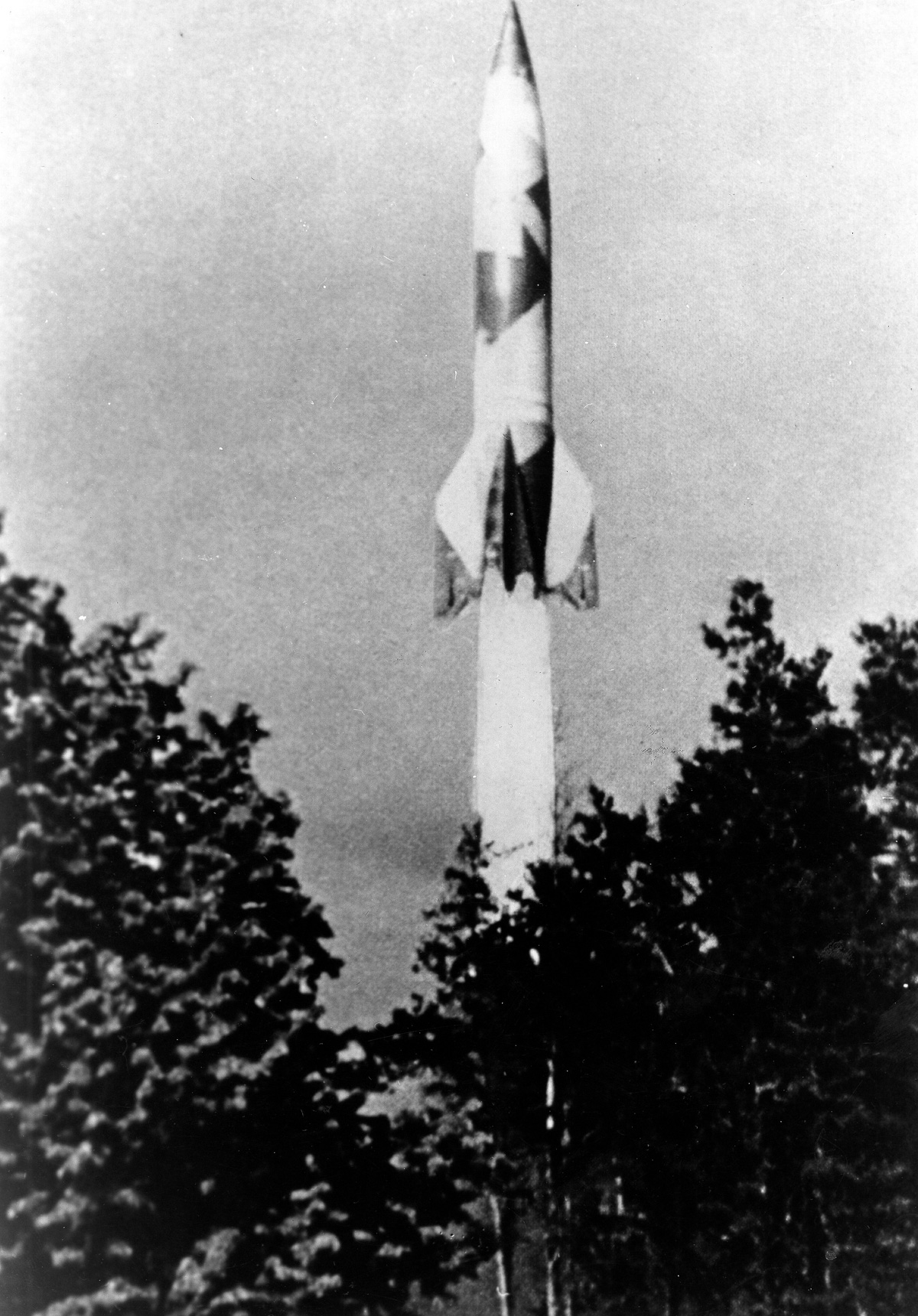
Attempts to attack the heavily camouflaged and highly mobile V-2 were unsuccessful, but CH did help provide some early warning

The British had no answer to the V-2 rocket bombardment that began in September 1944. The missiles flew too high and too fast to be detected during their approach, leaving no time even for an air raid warning to be sounded. Their supersonic speed meant that the explosions occurred without warning before the sound of their approach reached the target. The government initially tried to pass them off as explosions in the underground gas mains. It was clear this was not the case, and eventually, examples of the V-2 falling in its final plunge were captured on film.

In response, several CH stations were re-organized into the "Big Ben" system to report the V-2s during launch. No attempt was made to try to find the location of the launch; the radio-goniometer was simply too slow to use. Instead, each of the stations in the network, Bawdsey, Gt. Bromley, High St, Dunkirk and Swingate (Dover) were left set to their maximum range settings and in the altitude measuring mode. In this mode, the radar had several stacked lobes where they were sensitive to signals. As the missile ascended it would pass through these lobes in turn, causing a series of blips to fade in and out over time. The stations attempted to measure the ranges to the target as they flew through each of these lobes and forwarded that by telephone to a central plotting station.

At the station, these range measurements were plotted as arcs on a chart, known as range cuts. The intersections of the arcs defined the approximate area of the launcher. Since the missile approached the target as it climbed, each of these intersections would be closer to the target. Taking several of these, in turn, the trajectory of the missile could be determined to some degree of accuracy, and air raid warnings sent to likely areas.

Success in this task was aided by the missile fuselage profile, which acted as an excellent quarter-wave reflector for 12 m band HF radar. RAF Fighter Command was also informed of the launch in an effort to attack the sites. However, the German launch convoys were motorized, well camouflaged and highly mobile, making them extremely difficult to find and attack. The only known claim was made when Supermarine Spitfire pilots of No. 602 Squadron RAF squadron came across a V-2 rising from a wooded area, allowing a quick shot of unknown result.

=== ROTOR ===
The British radar defences were rapidly run down during the last years of the war, with many sites closed and others placed on "care and maintenance". However, immediate postwar tensions with the Soviet Union resulted in recommissioning of some wartime radars as a stopgap measure. Specific radars were remanufactured to peacetime standards of quality and reliability, which gave significant increases in range and accuracy. These rebuilt systems were the first phase of Chain Home's replacement system, ROTOR, which progressed through three phases from 1949 to 1958.

It had been pointed out from the start that due to the inherent timing of the interception task, about 23 minutes was required to carry out a single interception from initial detection. If the target was a high-speed jet bomber, this required about 240 miles (390 km) initial detection range. CH, even in its upgraded form, was barely capable of this under the best conditions. The GCI radars were not even close to this, and the entire ROTOR system relied on a new radar system becoming available by 1957 at the latest. In one of the few instances of this occurring, this requirement was actually beaten, with the first AMES Type 80 systems entering service in 1954.

The very last Chain Home Type 1 systems were retired in 1955 along with the wholesale demolition of most of the steel and timber towers.

=== CH today ===
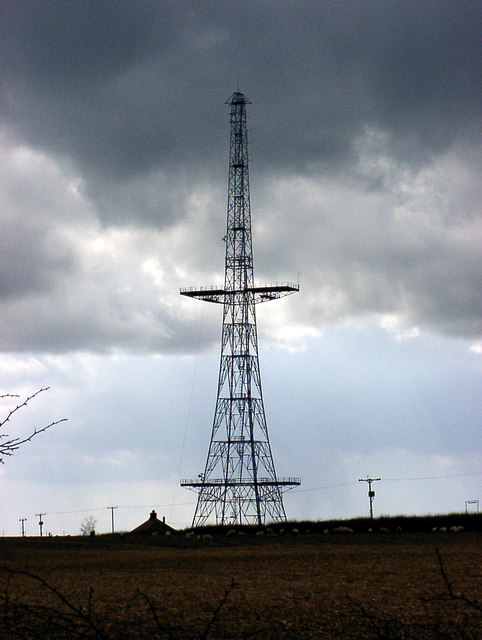
Stenigot Chain Home radar tower

Some of the steel transmitter towers remain, although the wooden receiver towers have all been demolished. The remaining towers have various new uses and in some cases are now protected as listed buildings by order of English Heritage. One such 360-foot-high (110 m) transmitter tower can now be found at the BAE Systems facility at Great Baddow in Essex, on the former Marconi Research Centre site. It originally stood at RAF Canewdon in Essex and was moved to Great Baddow in 1956. This is the only surviving Chain Home tower still in its original, unmodified form with cantilever platforms at 50 ft, 200 ft and 360 ft, and in 2019 was given Grade II listed status. Swingate transmitting station in Kent (originally AMES 04 Dover) has two original towers (three until 2010) which are used for microwave relay; the towers lost their platforms in the 1970s. RAF Stenigot in Lincolnshire has another, almost complete tower, without its top platforms; it is used for training aerial erectors.

The only original Chain Home site which is still used as a military radar station is RRH Staxton Wold in North Yorkshire, although there are no remnants of the 1937 equipment as it was completely cleared and remodelled for the ROTOR replacement, the Linesman/Mediator system, in 1964.

The 240-foot timber receiver towers were some of the tallest wooden structures ever built in Britain. Two of these wooden towers were still standing in 1955, at Hayscastle Cross. Unlike the transmitter tower pictured here, those at Hayscastle Cross were guyed. The wooden reception towers at Stoke Holy Cross were demolished in 1960. It is possible that a wooden tower standing at RAF Blakehill Farm, Wiltshire, in the 1970s or 1980s was a Chain Home survivor.

Wilkins would later repeat the Daventry Experiment for the 1977 BBC Television series The Secret War episode "To See For a Hundred Miles".

== Description ==
=== Mechanical layout ===
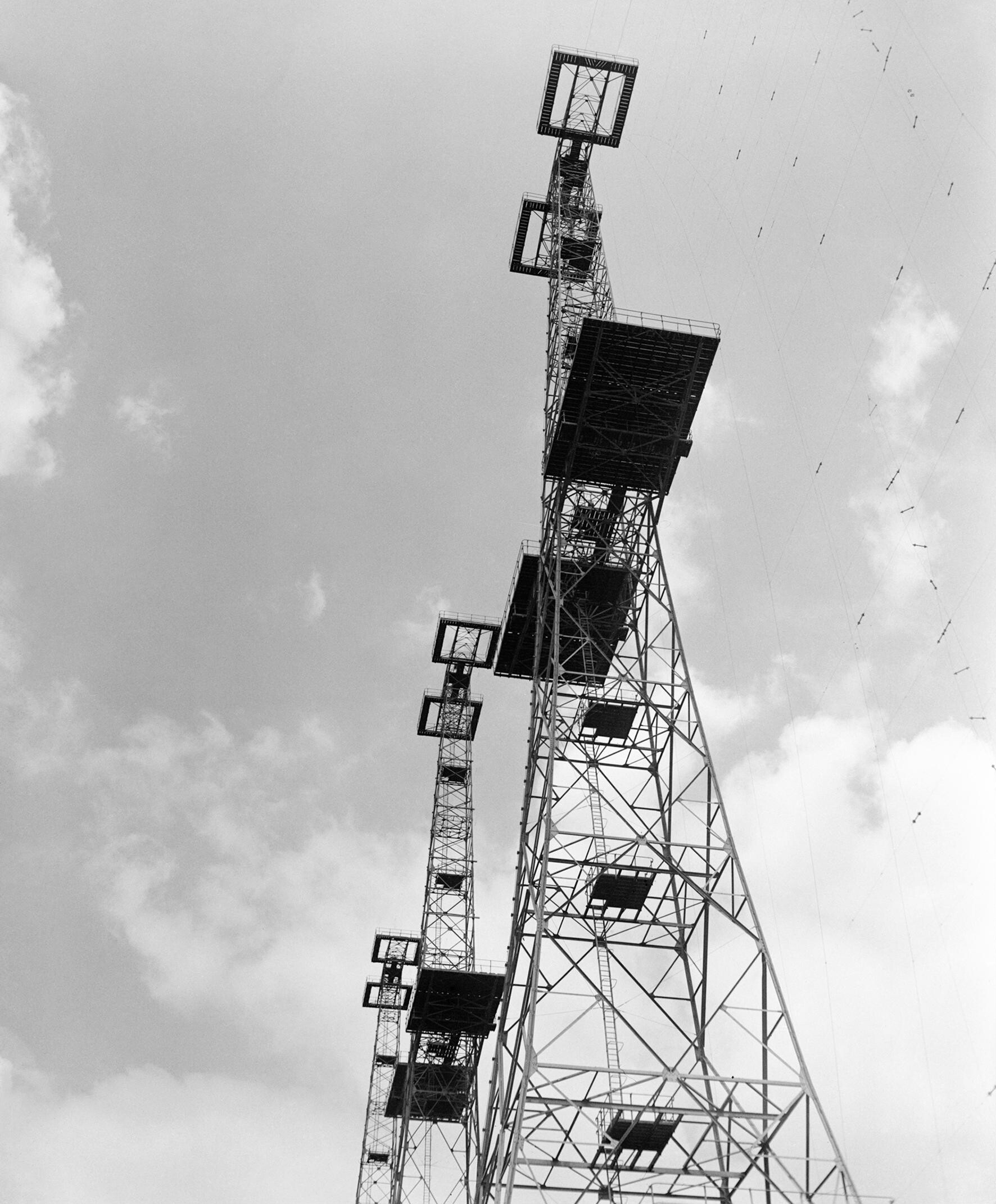
Three of the four transmitter towers of the Bawdsey CH station as seen in 1945. The antennas proper are just visible at the extreme right. These towers, as all of Chain Home, were built by J. L. Eve Construction.

Chain Home radar installations were normally composed of two sites. One compound contained the transmitter towers with associated structures, and a second compound, normally within a few hundred metres distance, contained the receiver masts and receiver equipment block where the operators (principally WAAF, Women's Auxiliary Air Force) worked. The CH system was, by modern terminology, a "bistatic radar", although modern examples normally have their transmitters and receivers far more widely separated.

The transmitter antenna consisted of four steel towers 360 feet (110 m) tall, set out in a line about 180 feet (55 m) apart. Three large platforms were stationed on the tower, at 50, 200 and 350 feet off the ground. A 600 ohm transmission cable was suspended from the top platform to the ground on either side of the platform (only on the inside of the end towers). Between these vertical feed cables were the antennas proper, eight half-wave dipoles strung between the vertical cables and spaced ½ of a wavelength apart. They were fed from alternating sides so the entire array of cables was in-phase, given their ½ wavelength spacing. Located behind each dipole was a passive reflector wire, spaced 0.18 wavelength back.

The resulting curtain array antenna produced a horizontally polarised signal that was directed strongly forward along the perpendicular to the line of the towers. This direction was known as the line of shoot, and was generally aimed out over the water. The broadcast pattern covered an area of about 100 degrees in a roughly fan-shaped area, with a smaller side lobe to the rear, courtesy of the reflectors, and much smaller ones to the sides. When the signal reflected off the ground it underwent a ½ wavelength phase-change, which caused it to interfere with the direct signal. The result was a series of vertically stacked lobes about 5 degrees wide from 1 degree off the ground to the vertical. The system was later expanded by adding another set of four additional antennas closer to the ground, wired in a similar fashion.

The receiver consisted of an Adcock array consisting of four 240 foot (73 m) tall wooden towers arranged at the corners of a square. Each tower had three sets (originally two) of receiver antennas, one at 45, 95 and 215 feet off the ground. The mean height of the transmitter stack was 215 feet, which is why the topmost antenna was positioned at the same altitude in order to produce a reception pattern that was identical to the transmission. A set of motor-driven mechanical switches allowed the operator to select which antenna was active. The output of the selected antenna on each of the four towers was sent to a single radiogoniometer system (not Watt's own huff-duff solution). By connecting the antennas together in X-Y pairs the horizontal bearing could be measured, while connecting together the upper and lower antennas allowed the same goniometer to be used to measure the vertical angle.

Two physical layout plans were used, either 'East Coast' or 'West Coast'. West Coast sites replaced the steel lattice towers with simpler guy-stayed masts, although they retained the same wooden towers for reception. East Coast sites had transmitter and receiver blocks protected with earth mounds and blast walls, along with separate reserve transmitter and receivers in small bunkers with attached 120 ft aerial masts. These reserves were in close proximity to the respective transmitter/receiver sites, often in a neighbouring field. West Coast sites relied on site dispersal for protection, duplicating the entire transmitter and receiver buildings.

=== Transmitter details ===
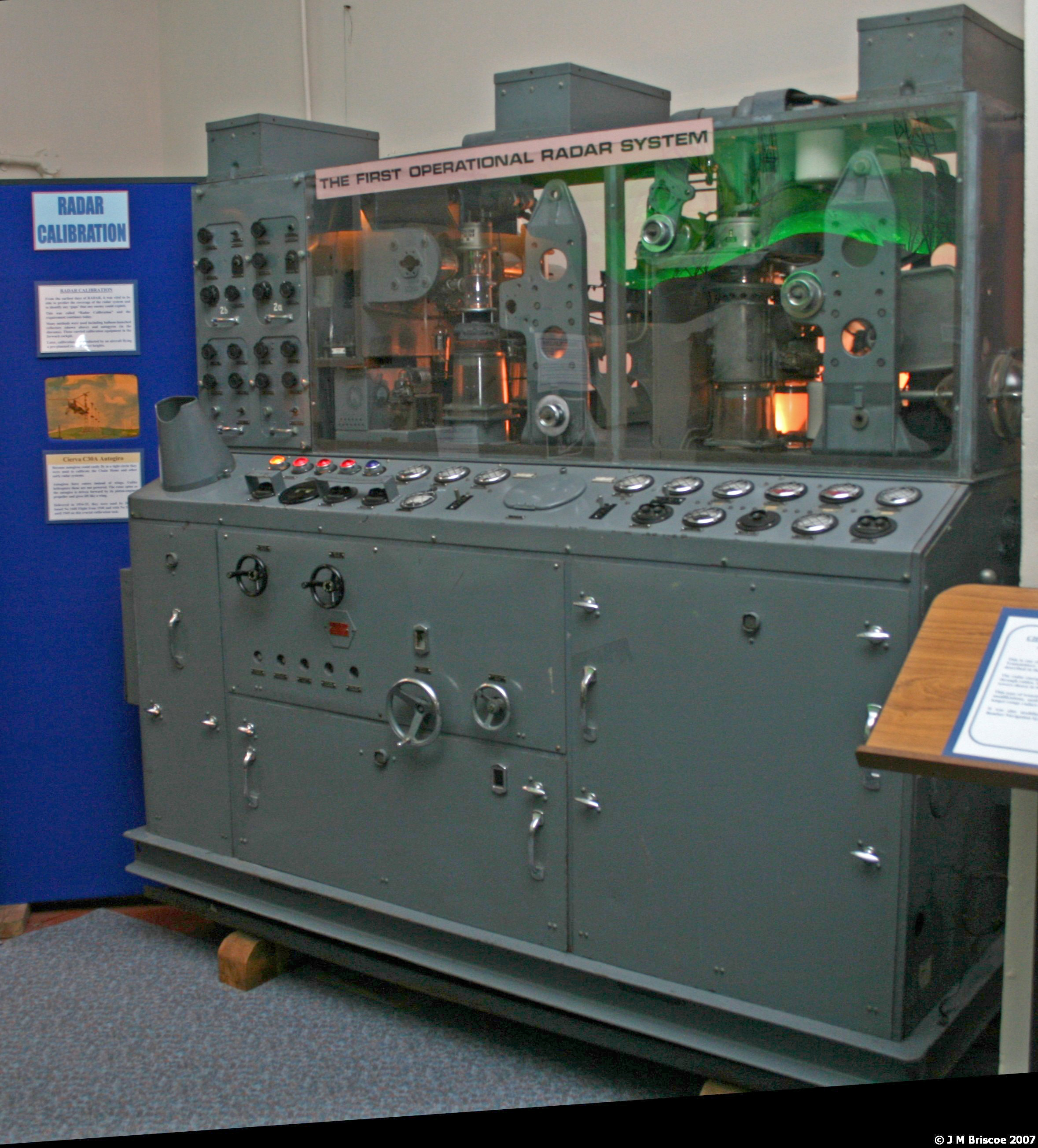
Chain Home transmitter, RAF Air Defence Radar Museum (2007)

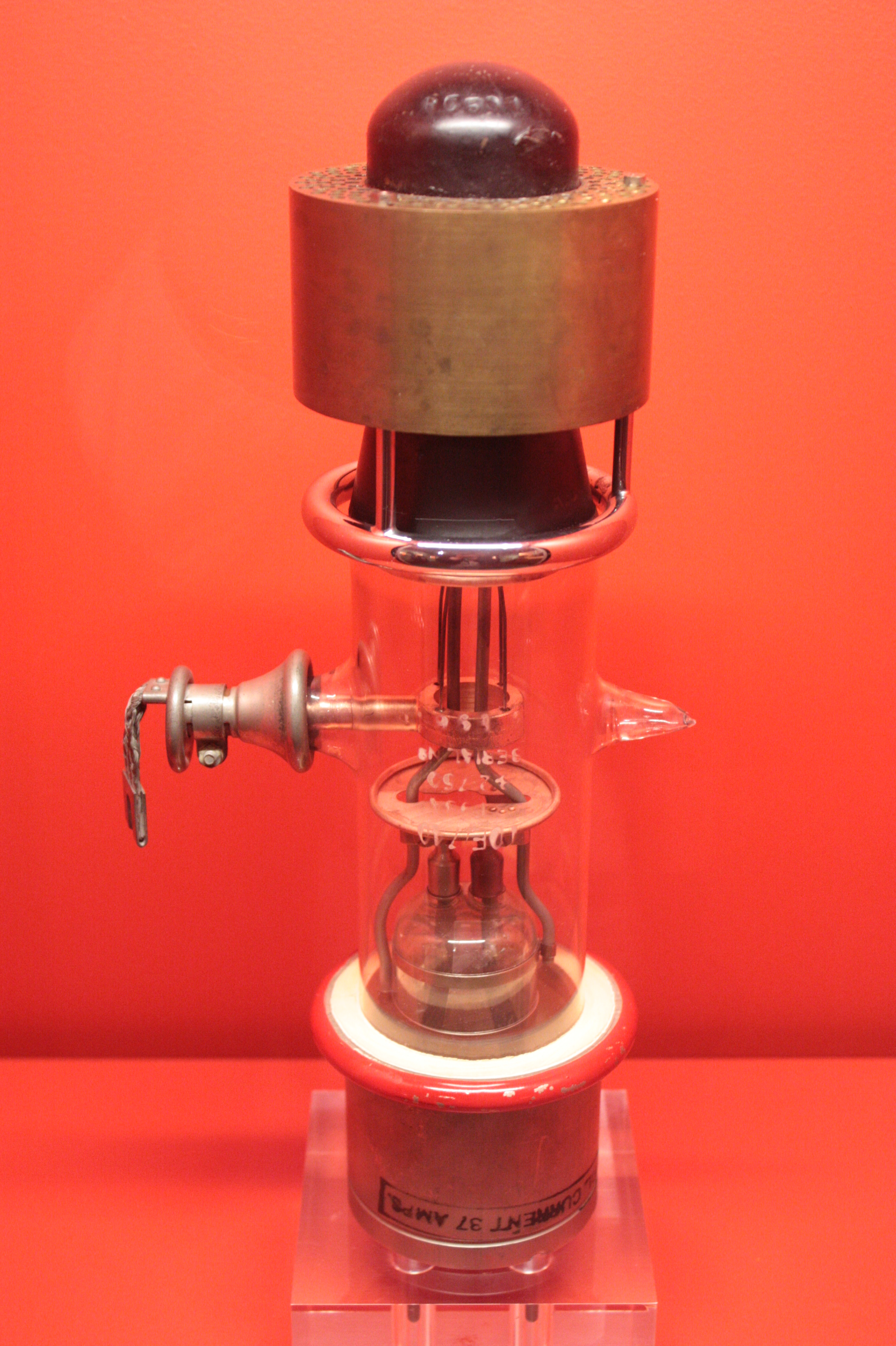
Chain Home transmitting valve, Science Museum, London. The valve was capable of being dismantled and consequently had to be continuously vacuum pumped while operating. This was done via the piping to the left.

Operation began with the Type T.3026 transmitter sending a pulse of radio energy into the transmission antennas from a hut beside the towers. Each station had two T.3026s, one active and one standby. The signal filled space in front of the antenna, flooding the entire area. Due to the transmission effects of the multiple stacked antennas, the signal was most strong directly along the line of shoot, and dwindled on either side. An area about 50 degrees to either side of the line was filled with enough energy to make detection practical.

The Type T.3026 transmitter was provided by Metropolitan-Vickers, based on a design used for a BBC transmitter at Rugby. A unique feature of the design was the "demountable" valves, which could be opened for service, and had to be connected to an oil diffusion vacuum pump for continual evacuation while in use. The valves were able to operate at one of four selected frequencies between 20 and 55 MHz, and switched from one to another in 15 seconds. To produce the short pulses of signal, the transmitter consisted of Hartley oscillators feeding a pair of tetrode amplifier valves. The tetrodes were switched on and off by a pair of mercury vapour thyratrons connected to a timing circuit, the output of which biased the control and screen grids of the tetrode positively while a bias signal kept it normally turned off.

Stations were arranged so their fan-shaped broadcast patterns slightly overlapped to cover gaps between the stations. However, it was found that the timers controlling the broadcasts could drift and the broadcasts from one station would begin to be seen at others, a phenomenon known as "running rabbits". To avoid this, power from the National Grid was used to provide a convenient phase-locked 50 Hz signal that was available across the entire nation. Each CH station was equipped with a phase-shifting transformer that triggered it at a different point on the grid waveform. The output of the transformer was fed to a Dippy oscillator that produced sharp pulses at 25 Hz, phase-locked to the output from the transformer. The locking was "soft", so short-term variations in the phase or frequency of the grid were filtered out.

During times of strong ionospheric reflection, especially at night, it was possible that the receiver would see reflections from the ground after one reflection. To address this problem, the system was later provided with a second pulse repetition frequency at 12.5 pps, which meant that a reflection would have to be from further than 6,000 miles (9,700 km) away before it would be seen during the next reception period.

=== Receiver details ===
In addition to triggering the broadcast signal, the output of the transmitter trigger signal was also sent to the receiver hut. Here it fed the input to a time base generator that drove the X-axis deflection plates of the CRT display. This caused the electron beam in the tube to start moving left-to-right at the instant that the transmission was completed. Due to the slow decay of the pulse, some of the transmitted signal was received on the display. This signal was so powerful it overwhelmed any reflected signal from targets, which meant that objects closer than about 5 miles (8.0 km) could not be seen on the display. To reduce this period even to this point required the receiver to be hand-tuned, selecting the decoupling capacitors and impedance of the power supplies.

The receiver system, built by A.C. Cossor to a TRE design, was a multiple-stage superheterodyne. The signal from the selected antennas on the receiver towers was fed through the radiogoniometer and then into a three-stage amplifier, with each stage housed in a metal screen box to avoid interference between the stages. Each stage used a Class B amplifier arrangement of EF8s, special low noise, "aligned-grid" pentodes. (Note: Introduced in 1938, the EF8 was not technically a pentode as it had 4 grids making it a hexode. However, the purpose of the fourth grid and the alignment of the remaining grids was to reduce the partition noise from which pentodes generally suffer. Since the device exhibited pentode characteristics, all literature generally describes it as a 'pentode. It is not clear whether the device was specifically developed for the chain home system.) The output of the initial amplifier was then sent to the intermediate frequency mixer, which extracted a user-selectable amount of the signal, 500, 200 or 50 kHz as selected by a switch on the console. The first setting allowed most of the signal through, and was used under most circumstances. The other settings were available to block out interference, but did so by also blocking some of the signal which reduced the overall sensitivity of the system.

The output of the mixer was sent to the Y-axis deflection plates in a specially designed high-quality CRT. For reasons not well explained in the literature, this was arranged to deflect the beam downward with increasing signal. (Note: The image of the operator console on this page appears to offer the solution; the line is not being drawn across the top of the display, but the middle, where it is the widest and thus provides the greatest resolution. The tube is then placed in a box with the upper section covered, so the line on the middle of the CRT appears at the top of the resulting opening. Of course this could also be operated upward.) When combined with the X-axis signal from the time base generator, echoes received from distant objects caused the display to produce blips along the display. By measuring the centre point of the blip against a mechanical scale along the top of the display, the range to the target could be determined. This measurement was later aided by the addition of the calibrator unit or strobe, which caused additional sharp blips to be drawn every 10 miles (16 km) along the display. The markers were fed from the same electronic signals as the time base, so it was always properly calibrated.

=== Distance and bearing measurement ===
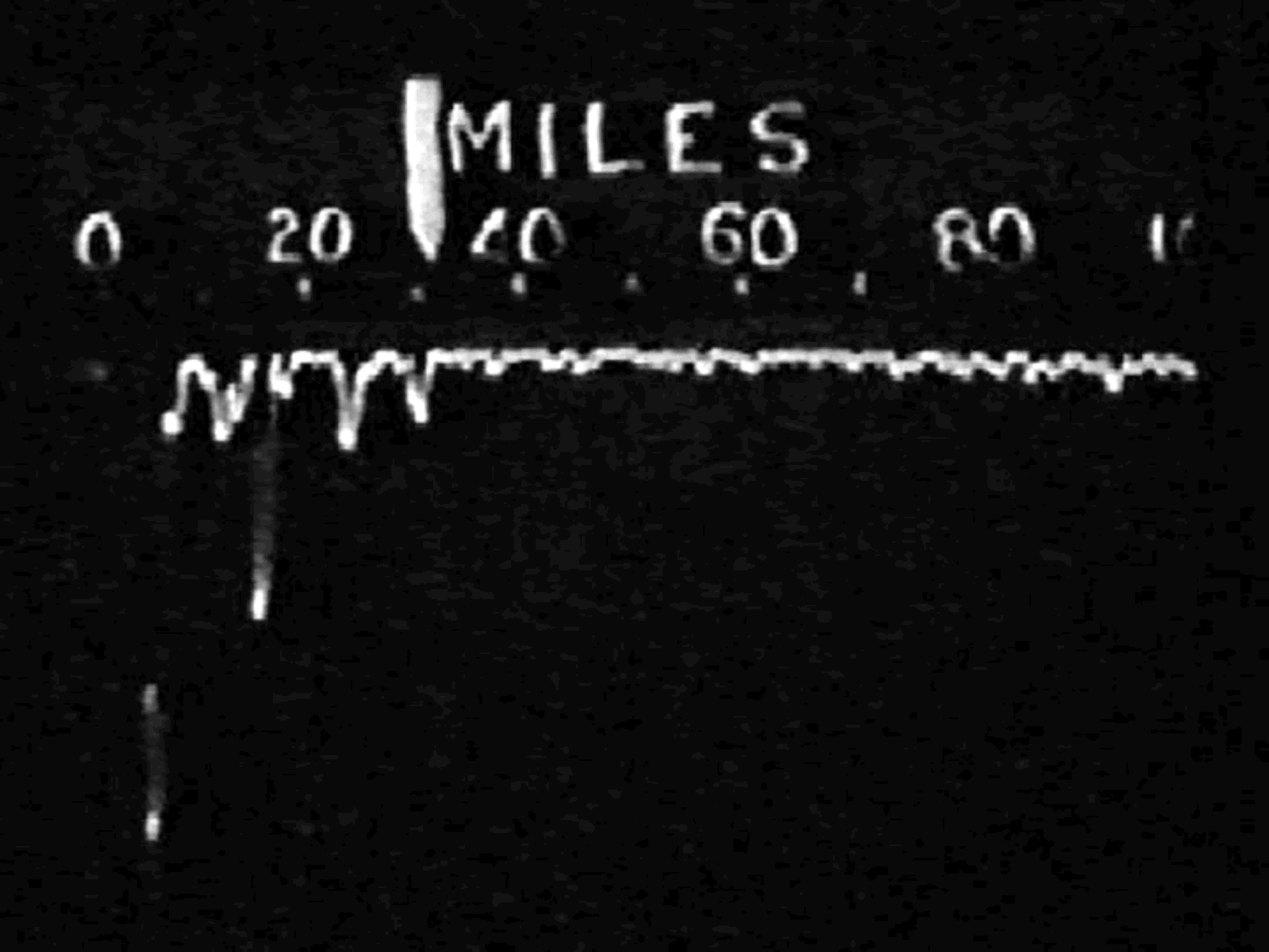
Chain Home display showing several target blips between 15 and 30 miles distant from the station. The marker at the top of the screen was used to send the range to the fruit machine.

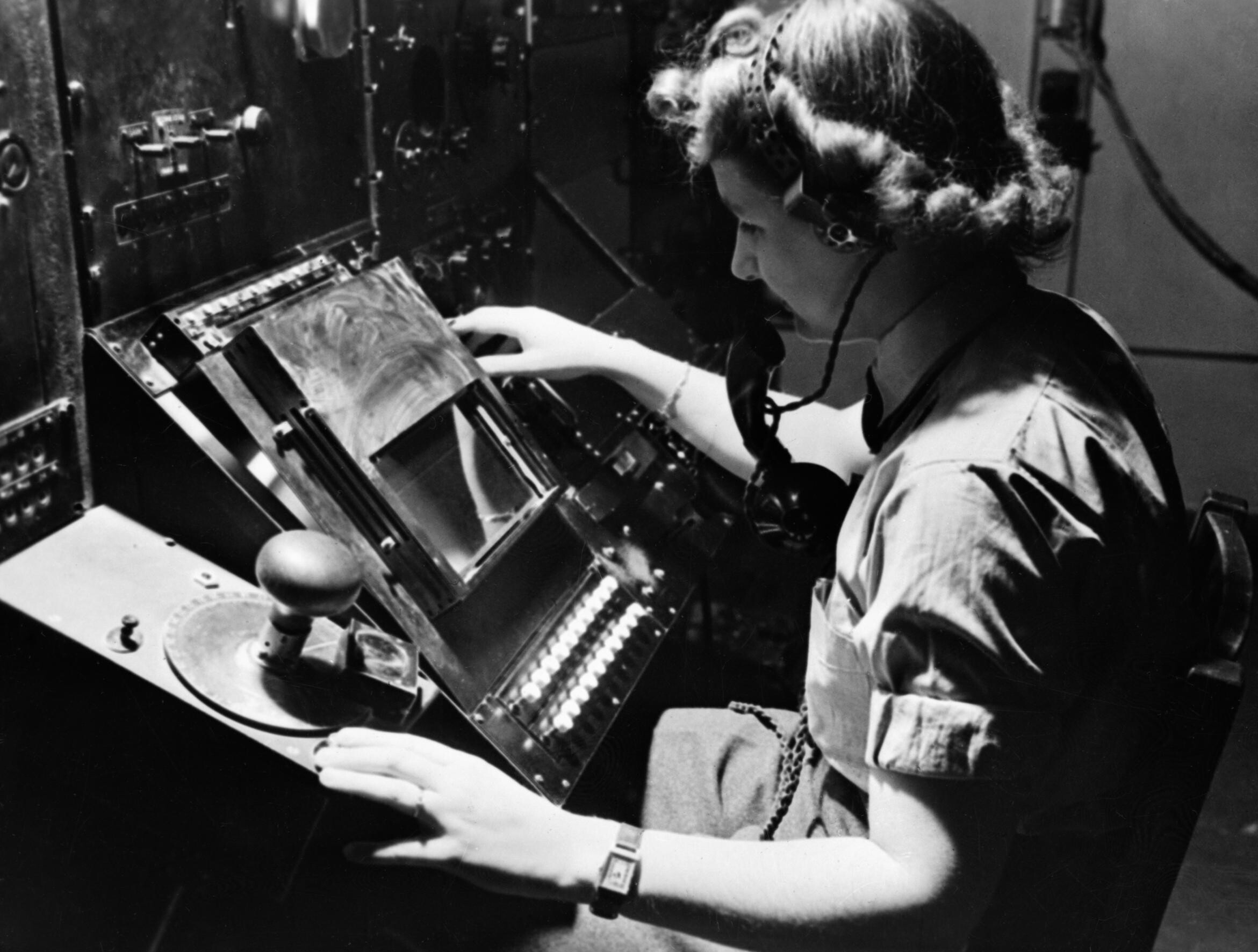
The operator display of the CH system was a complex affair. The large knob on the left is the goniometer control with the sense button that made the antenna more directional.

Determining the location in space of a given blip was a complex multi-step process. First the operator would select a set of receiver antennas using the motorized switch, feeding signals to the receiver system. The antennas were connected together in pairs, forming two directional antennas, sensitive primarily along the X and Y axes respectively, Y being the line of shoot. The operator would then "swing the gonio", or "hunt", back and forth until the selected blip reached its minimum deflection on this display (or maximum, at 90 degrees off). The operator would measure the distance against the scale, and then tell the plotter the range and bearing of the selected target. The operator would then select a different blip on the display and repeat the process. For targets at different altitudes, the operator might have to try different antennas to maximize the signal.

On the receipt of a set of polar coordinates from the radar operator, the plotter's task was to convert these to X and Y locations on a map. They were provided with large maps of their operational area printed on lightweight paper so they could be stored for future reference. A rotating straightedge with the centrepoint at the radar's location on the map was fixed on top, so when the operator called an angle the plotter would rotate the straightedge to that angle, look along it to pick off the range, and plot a point. The range called from the operator is the line-of-sight range, or slant range, not the over-ground distance from the station. To calculate the actual location over the ground, the altitude also had to be measured (see below) and then calculated using simple trigonometry. A variety of calculators and aids were used to help in this calculation step.

As the plotter worked, the targets would be updated over time, causing a series of marks, or plots, to appear that indicated the targets' direction of motion, or track. Track-tellers standing around the map would then relay this information via telephone to the filter room at RAF Bentley Priory, where a dedicated telephone operator relayed that information to plotters on a much larger map. In this way the reports from multiple stations were re-created into a single overall view.

Due to differences in reception patterns between stations, as well as differences in received signals from different directions even at a single station, the reported locations varied from the target's real location by a varying amount. The same target as reported from two different stations could appear in very different locations on the filter room's plot. It was the job of the filter room to recognize these were actually the same plot, and re-combine them into a single track. From then on each track was identified by a number, which would be used for all future communications. When first reported the tracks were given an "X" prefix, and then "H" for Hostile or "F" for friendly once identified. (Note: Other codes may have been used as well, this is not intended to be an exhaustive list.) This data was then sent down the telephone network to the Group and Section headquarters where the plots were again re-created for local control over the fighters.

The data also went sideways to other defence units such as Royal Navy, Army anti-aircraft gun sites, and RAF barrage balloon operations. There was also comprehensive liaison with the civil authorities, principally Air Raid Precautions.

=== Altitude measurement ===
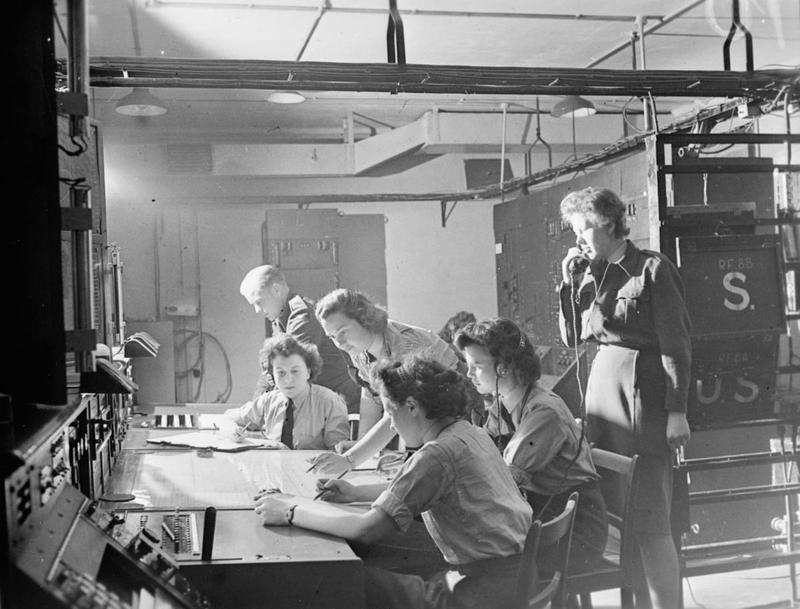
Plotting and reporting tracks was a manpower intensive operation. This image shows the receiver station at RAF Bawdsey, the home of CH development. It is commanded by Flight Officer Wright, on the phone. The radar operator is just visible in the background, just right of centre. She communicated with the plotter, in the foreground wearing headphones, via intercom so the readings could be made out even under attack.

Due to the arrangement of the receiver antennas, the sensitive area had a number of side lobes that allowed reception at multiple vertical angles. Typically the operator would use the upper set of antennas at 215 ft (66 m), which had the clearest view of the horizon. Due to the half-wave interference from the ground, the main lobe from this antenna was directed at about 2.5 degrees above the horizontal, with its sensitive region extending from about 1 to 3 degrees. At the ground the gain was zero, which allowed aircraft to escape detection by flying at low altitudes. The second lobe extended from about 6 to 12 degrees, and so on. This left a distinct gap in the reception pattern centred at about 5.2 degrees.

This reception pattern provided CH with a relatively accurate way to estimate the altitude of the target. To do this, the motorized switch in the receiver hut was used to disconnect the four receiver masts and instead select the two vertically displaced antennas on one mast. When connected to the radiogoniometer, the output on the display was now effected by the relative signal strength of the two lobes, rather than the relative strengths in X and Y in the horizontal plane. The operator swung the radiogoniometer looking for the peak or minimum reception, as before, and noted the angle.

The number reported by the operator was the line-of-sight range to the target, or slant range, which included components of both the horizontal distance and altitude. To convert this to the real range on the ground, the plotter used basic trigonometry on a right angle triangle; the slant range was the hypotenuse and the open angle was the measurement from the radiogoniometer. The base and opposite sides could then be calculated, revealing the distance and altitude. An important correction was the curvature of the Earth, which became significant at the ranges CH worked at. Once calculated, this allowed the range to be properly plotted, revealing the grid square for the target, which was then reported up the chain.

When the target was first detected at long range, the signal typically did not have enough of a return in the second lobe to perform height finding. This only became possible as the aircraft approached the station. Eventually this problem would recur as the target centred itself in the second lobe, and so forth. Additionally, it was not possible to determine the difference between a signal being compared between the first and second or second and third lobe, which caused some ambiguity at short ranges. However, as the altitude was likely determined long before this, this tended not to be a problem in practice.

This pattern left a set of distinct angles where reception in both lobes was very low. To address this, a second set of receiver antennas was installed at 45 feet (14 m). When the lower antennas were used, the pattern was shifted upward, providing strong reception in the "gaps", at the cost of diminished long-range reception due to the higher angles.

=== Raid assessment ===
Another critical function of the CH operators was to estimate the number and type of aircraft in a raid. A gross level of the overall size could be determined by the strength of the return. But a much more accurate determination could be made by observing the "beat" rate of the composite echoes, the way they grew and diminished over time as they entered into different sections of the antenna reception pattern. To aid this, the operator could reduce the pulse length to 6 microseconds (from 20) with a push-button. This improved the range resolution, spreading the blip out on the display at the cost of lower returned energy.

Raid assessment was largely an acquired skill and continued to improve with operator experience. In measured tests, experimenters found that acquired skill was so great that experienced operators could often pick out targets with returns less than the current signal-to-noise ratio. How this was accomplished was a great mystery at the time–the operators were spotting blips in static that were larger than the signal. It is currently believed this is a form of stochastic resonance.

=== Fruit machine ===
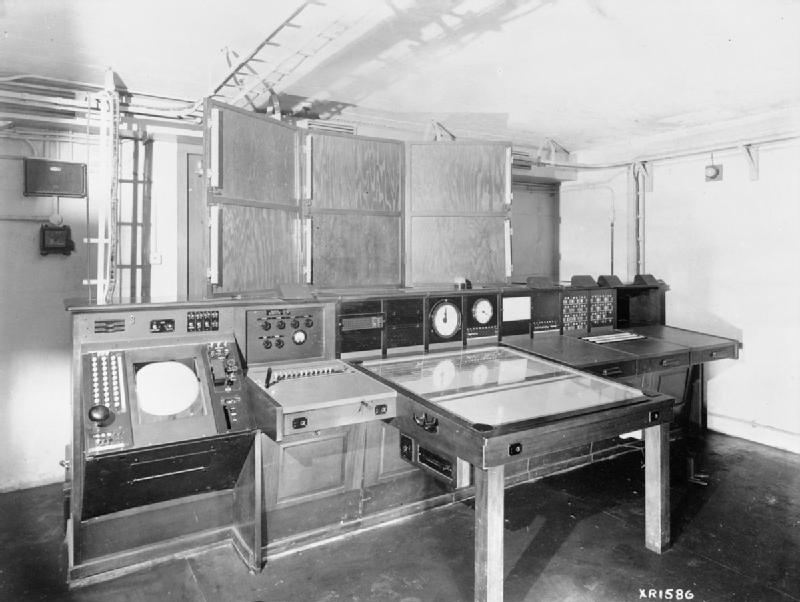
The fruit machine greatly simplified measurement and calculation, driving the plotter directly

Operating a CH station was a manpower-intensive situation, with an operator in the transmitter hut, an operator and assistant in the receiver hut, and as many as six assistants in the receiver hut operating the plotters, calculators and telephone systems. In order to provide 24-hour service, multiple crews were needed, along with a number of service and support personnel. This was then multiplied by the reporting hierarchy, which required similar numbers of WAAFs at each level of the Dowding system hierarchy.

Plotting the angle of the target was a simple process of taking the gonio reading and setting a rotating straightedge to that value. The problem was determining where along that straightedge the target lay; the radar measured the slant range straight-line distance to the target, not the distance over the ground. That distance was affected by the target's altitude, which had to be determined by taking the somewhat time-consuming altitude measurements. Additionally, that altitude was affected by the range, due to the curvature of the Earth, as well as any imperfections in the local environment, which caused the lobes to have different measurements depending on the target angle.

As no small part of the manpower required was dedicated to calculation and plotting, a great reduction could be made by using as much automation as possible. This started with the use of various mechanical aids; these were eventually replaced by the fruit machine, an electromechanical analogue computer of some complexity. It replicated all of these devices and tables in electrical form. An electrical repeater, or synchro, was added to the gonio dial. To measure the range, a new dial was added that moved a mechanical marker to a selected blip on the display. When a particular target was properly selected, the operator pushed a button to activate the fruit machine, which then read these inputs. In addition to the inputs, the fruit machine also had a series of local corrections for both angle and altitude, as measured by calibration flights and stored in the machine in telephone uniselectors. These corrections were automatically added to the calculation, eliminating the time-consuming lookup of these numbers from tables. The output was the altitude, which then allowed the plotters to determine the proper over-ground distance to the target.

Later versions of the fruit machine were upgraded to directly output the position of the aircraft with no manual operation. Using the same buttons to send settings to the machine, the operator simply triggered the system and the outputs were used to drive a T-square-like indicator on the chart, allowing the operator to read the calculated location directly. This reduced the number of people needed at the station and allowed the station to be reorganized into a much more compact form. No longer did the operator call readings out to the plotters; now they sat directly beside the plotting table so they could see if the results looked right, while the tellers could see the plot and call it into the area plotting room. A further upgrade allowed the data to be sent to the local plotting room automatically over the phone lines, further reducing the required manpower.

== Detection, jamming and counter-jamming ==
=== Early detection ===
From May to August 1939 the LZ130 Graf Zeppelin II made flights along Britain's North Sea coast to investigate the 100-metre-high radio towers that were being erected from Portsmouth to Scapa Flow. LZ130 performed a series of radiometric tests and took photographs. German sources report the 12 m Chain Home signals were detected and suspected to be radar; however, the chief investigator was not able to prove his suspicions. Other sources are said to report different results. (Note: Claims have been made that the LZ130 missions (1) failed to detect any radio emissions of interest at all; (2) failed to identify the true purpose of the new British stations, concluding the towers were for long-range naval radio communication, not radio location; and (3) failed to identify the origin of the signals as the towers that had aroused the interest in the first place. It is agreed that German scientists were not certain of British radar defences, and these claims may reflect the debate among those scientists.)

During the Battle of France, the Germans observed 12 m pulse signals on the western front without being able to recognize their origin and purpose. In mid-June 1940, the Deutsche Versuchsanstalt für Luftfahrt (DVL, German Aeronautic Research Institute) set up a special group under the direction of Professor von Handel and found out that the signals originated from the installations on the coast of the English Channel.

Their suspicions were finally proven in the aftermath of the Battle of Dunkirk, when the British were forced to abandon a mobile gun-laying radar (GL Mk. I) station in Normandy. Wolfgang Martini's team of specialists was able to determine the operation of the system. GL was a rather crude system of limited effectiveness, and this led the Germans to have a dim view of British radar systems. However, an effective system requires more than just the radar; plotting and reporting are equally important, and this part of the system was fully developed in Chain Home. The Germans' failure to realize the value of the system as a whole has been pointed to as one of their great failings during the war.

=== Anti-jamming technologies ===
The British had been aware that the Germans would determine the purpose of the system and attempt to interfere with it, and had designed in a variety of features and methods in order to address some of these issues even as the first stations were being built. The most obvious of these was CH's ability to operate on different frequencies, which was added to allow the stations to avoid any sort of continuous-broadcast interference on their operating frequency. Additionally, the Interference Rejection Unit, or IFRU, allowed the output of the intermediate stages of the amplifiers to be clipped in an attempt to finely tune the receiver to the station's own signals and help reject broadband signals.

More complex was a system built into the CH displays, implemented in order to remove spurious signals from unsynchronized jamming pulses. It consisted of two layers of phosphor in the CRT screen, a quick-reacting layer of zinc sulphide below, and a slower "afterglow" layer of zinc cadmium sulphide on top. During normal operation the bright blue signal from the zinc sulphide was visible, and its signal would activate the yellow zinc cadmium sulphide layer, causing an "averaged" signal to be displayed in yellow. To filter out jamming pulses, a yellow plastic sheet was placed in front of the display, rendering the blue display invisible and revealing the dimmer yellow averaged signal. This is the reason many radars from the War through to the 1960s have yellow displays.

Another method was to use range-only measurements from multiple CH stations to produce fixes on individual targets, the "Chapman method". To aid this task, a second display would be installed that would be fed the Y-axis signal from a distant CH station over telephone lines. This way the operator could directly compare the two signals, eliminating the delays if this information was transmitted by voice. This system was never required.

=== First attempts, halting follow-up ===
When jamming was first attempted by the Germans it was in a much more clever fashion than had been anticipated. The observation that the transmissions of the individual stations were spread out in time, in order to avoid mutual interference, was exploited. A system was designed to send back spurious broadband pulses on a chosen CH station's time slot. The CH operator could avoid this signal simply by changing their time slot slightly, so the jamming was not received. This caused the station's signals to start overlapping another's time slot, so that station would attempt the same cure, affecting another station in the network, and so forth.

A series of such jammers were set up in France starting in July 1940, and soon concentrated into a single station in Calais that affected CH for some time. However, the timing of these attempts was extremely ill-considered. The British quickly developed operational methods to counteract this jamming, and these had effectively eliminated the effect of the jamming by the opening of the Battle of Britain on 10 July. The Germans were well on their way to develop more sophisticated jamming systems, but these were not ready for operation until September. This meant that the CH system was able to operate unmolested throughout the Battle, and led to its well-publicized successes.

By the opening of the Battle in July the German Luftwaffe operational units were well aware of CH, and had been informed by the DVL that they could not expect to remain undetected, even in clouds. In spite of these warnings, the Luftwaffe did little to address this and treated the entire topic with some level of disdain. Their own radars were superior to CH in many ways, but had proven to be only marginally useful. During the Air Battle of the Heligoland Bight in 1939, a German Freya radar detected the raid while it was still an hour away from its target, yet had no way to report this to any of the fighter units that could intercept it. Getting the information from the radar to the pilots in a useful form appeared to be a difficult problem, and the Germans believed the British would have the same difficulty and thus radar would have little real effect.

Some desultory effort was put into attacking the CH stations, especially during the opening stages of the Battle. British engineers were able to quickly return these units to service, or in some cases simply pretend to do so in order to fool the Germans into thinking the attacks failed. As the pattern of these attacks became clear, the RAF began to counter them with increasing effectiveness. The Junkers Ju 87 dive bombers were subjected to catastrophic losses and had to be withdrawn from battle. The Germans gave up trying to attack CH directly on any reasonable scale.

Thus, CH was allowed to operate throughout the Battle largely unhindered. Although communications were indeed a serious problem, it was precisely this problem that the Dowding system had been set up to address, at great expense. The result was that every British fighter was roughly twice or perhaps more as effective than its German counterpart. Some raids were met with 100% of the fighters dispatched successfully engaging their targets, while German aircraft returned home over half the time never having seen the enemy. It is for this reason that Churchill credits Chain Home with winning the Battle.

=== Spoofing jammers, jitter ===
A second jamming system was eventually activated at Cap Gris Nez in September, using a system that triggered its signal in response to the reception of a pulse from CH. This meant that the system responded to the CH station even if it moved its time slot. These systems, known as Garmisch-Partenkirchen, were used during Operation Donnerkeil in 1941. Further improvements to the basic concept allowed multiple returns to be generated, appearing like multiple aircraft on the CH display.

Although these new jammers were relatively sophisticated, CH operators quickly adapted to them by periodically changing the pulse repetition frequency (PRF) of their station's transmitter. This caused the synchronized jamming signals to briefly go out of synch with the station, and the blips from the jammers would "jitter" on the screen, allowing them to be visually distinguished. The "Intentional Jitter Anti-Jamming Unit", IJAJ, performed this automatically and randomly, making it impossible for the German jammers to match the changes.

Another upgrade helped reject unsynchronized pulses, supplanting the two-layer display. This device, the "Anti-Jamming Black-Out" unit, AJBO, fed the Y-axis signal into a delay and then into the brightness control of the CRT. Short pulses that appeared and disappeared were muted, disappearing from the display. Similar techniques using acoustic delay lines, both for jamming reduction and filtering out noise, became common on many radar units during the war.

=== Klein Heidelberg ===
The Germans also made use of CH for their own passive radar system, known as Klein Heidelberg. This used CH's transmissions as their source, and a series of antennas along the Channel coast as the receiver. By comparing the time of arrival of the signals from a selected aircraft, its range and direction could be determined with some accuracy. Since the system sent out no signals of its own, the allies were not aware of it until they overran the stations in 1944. Most of the stations had only just been built when they were overrun.

== Comparison with other systems ==
Modern texts are often dismissive of Chain Home, viewing it as "dead end technology with serious shortcomings".

In many respects, CH was a crude system, both in theory and in comparison with other systems of the era. This is especially true when CH is compared with its German counterpart, the Freya. Freya operated on shorter wavelengths, in the 2.5 to 2.3 m (120 to 130 MHz) band, allowing it to be broadcast from a much smaller antenna. This meant that Freya did not have to use the two-part structure of CH with a floodlight transmission, and could instead send its signal in a more tightly focused beam like a searchlight. This greatly reduced the amount of energy needed to be broadcast, as a much smaller volume was being filled with the transmission. Direction finding was accomplished simply by turning the antenna, which was small enough to make this relatively easy to arrange. Additionally, the higher frequency of the signal allowed higher resolution, which aided operational effectiveness. However, Freya had a shorter maximum range of 100 miles (160 km), and could not accurately determine altitude.

It should be remembered that CH was deliberately designed specifically to use off-the-shelf components wherever possible. Only the receiver was truly new, the transmitter was adapted from commercial systems and this is the primary reason the system used such a long wavelength. CH stations were designed to operate at 20–50 MHz, the "boundary area" between high frequency and VHF bands at 30 MHz, although typical operations were at 20–30 MHz (the upper end of the HF band), or about a 12 m wavelength (25 MHz). The detection range was typically 120 miles (190 km; 100 nmi), but could be better.

The main limitation in use was that Chain Home was a fixed system, non-rotational, which meant it could not see beyond its sixty-degree transmission arc or behind it once the targets had flown overhead, and so raid plotting over land was down to ground observers, principally the Observer Corps (from April 1941 known as the Royal Observer Corps). Ground-based observation was acceptable during the day but useless at night and in conditions of reduced visibility. This problem was lessened on introduction of more advanced surveillance radars with 360-degree tracking and height-finding capability and, more importantly, aircraft fitted with Airborne Intercept radar (AI), which had been developed in parallel with Chain Home from 1936 onwards. This new equipment began to appear in late 1940 fitted to Bristol Blenheim, Bristol Beaufighter and Boulton Paul Defiant aircraft.

Even as the CH system was being deployed, a wide variety of experiments with newer designs was being carried out. By 1941 the Type 7 Ground Control Intercept Radar (GCI) on a wavelength of 1.5 m was entering production, and reached widespread service in 1942.

== Chain Home sites ==
External images
- Type 1 Chain Home Map shows modern aerial photographs of the locations of AMES Type 1 Chain Home.
- Type 2 Chain Home Low Map shows modern aerial photographs of the locations of AMES Type 2 Chain Home Low.
- Type 2 Chain Home Extra Low Map shows modern aerial photographs of the locations of Chain Home Extra Low. (Note: These show the locations of all 'Mainland' UK Chain Home Type 1 / Type 2 sites. Northern Ireland had comprehensive Type 1 / Type 2 cover but these stations are not shown on the maps.)

Radar site locations in this period are complicated due to the rapid growth in technology 1936–45 and the changing operational requirements. By 1945 there were 100+ radar sites in the UK. One of the primary objectives of post war ROTOR was to streamline and manage an unwieldy network that grew rapidly 'as required' in the war years.

Individual sites are listed below:

| Site | AMES No. | Location | Region | Coordinates | Ref. |
|---|---|---|---|---|---|
| Bawdsey | | | Suffolk | TM3412038310 | |
| Beachy Head | | | East Sussex | | |
| Branscombe | | | Devon | SY1988 | |
| Brenish | | | Western Isles | NA9910024250 | |
| Bride | | | Isle of Man | NX4604 | |
| Broadbay | | | Western Isles | NB5314034470 | |
| Canewdon | | | Essex | TQ9094 | |
| Castell Mawr | 67 | Llanrhystud | Ceredigion | SN5369 | |
| RAF Clee Hill | | | Shropshire | SO5900877942 | |
| Dalby | | | Isle of Man | SC2141878536 | |
| Danby Beacon | | Danby | North Yorkshire | NZ732097 | |
| Darsham | | | Suffolk | TM408718 | |
| Dengie | | | Essex | TL9850701703 | |
| Douglas Wood | | Monikie | Angus | NO4862041515 | |
| Dover (Swingate) | | | Kent | TR335429 | |
| Downderry | | | Cornwall | | |
| Drone Hill | | Coldingham | Borders | NT8447066535 | |
| Drytree | | Goonhilly Downs | Cornwall | SW723218 | |
| Dunkirk | | | Kent | TR076595 | |
| Folly | | Nolton | Pembrokeshire | SM858195 | |
| Great Bromley | | | Essex | TM104265 | |
| Greystone | 61 | | County Down Northern Ireland | | |
| Hawks Tor | | Plymouth | Devon | SX5506062240 | |
| Hayscastle Cross | | | Pembrokeshire | SM920256 | |
| Hillhead | | Memsie | Aberdeenshire | NJ9430061700 | |
| Kilkeel | 78 | | County Down, Northern Ireland | | |
| Kilkenneth | | Tiree | Argyll and Bute | NL9408045570 | |
| Loth | | Helmsdale | Sutherland | NC9590009600 | |
| Netherbutton | | Holm | Orkney | HY4621104396 | |
| Nefyn | 66 | | Gwynedd | SH2704037575 | |
| Newchurch | | | Kent | TR0531 | |
| North Cairn | 60 | Stranraer | Dumfries | NW97107074 | |
| Northam | | | Devon | SS4529 | |
| Noss Hill: | | | Shetland Islands | HU3613015575 | |
| Ottercops Moss | | Otterburn | Northumberland | NY944896 | |
| Pevensey | | | East Sussex | TQ644073 | |
| Poling | | | West Sussex | TQ043052 | |
| Port Mor | | Tiree | Argyll and Bute | NL9442 | |
| Ravenscar | | | North Yorkshire | | |
| Renscombe Down | | | Dorset | | |
| Rhuddlan | 65 | | Denbighshire | SJ012764 | |
| Ringstead | | Ringstead Bay | Dorset | SY751817 | |
| Rye | | | East Sussex | TQ968232 | |
| St. Lawrence, Isle of Wight | | | Isle of Wight | SZ530760 | |
| Saligo Bay | | Islay | Argyll and Bute | NR2116066740 | |
| Sango | | Durness | Sutherland | NC4170067500 | |
| Saxmundham | | | Suffolk | TM411720 | |
| Scarlett | | | Isle of Man | SC2566 | |
| Schoolhill | | Porthlethen | Aberdeenshire | NO9086098180 | |
| Sennen | | | Cornwall | SW376246 | |
| Skaw | | Unst | Shetland Islands | HP6634016805 | |
| Southbourne | | | Dorset | SZ1591 | |
| Staxton Wold | | | North Yorkshire | TA023778 | |
| Stenigot | | Louth | Lincolnshire | TF256827 | |
| Stoke Holy Cross | | | Norfolk | TG257028 | |
| Tannach | | Wick | Caithness | ND3200046900 | |
| Tower | 64 | Blackpool | Lancashire | SD306357 | |
| Trelanvean | | Goonhilly Downs | Cornwall | SW762193 | |
| Trerew | | Newquay | Cornwall | SW812585 | |
| Ventnor | | | Isle of Wight | SZ568785 | |
| Warren | | | Pembrokeshire | SR9397 | |
| RAF West Beckham | 32 | West Beckham | Norfolk | TG1402138869 | |
| West Prawle | | | Devon | SX771374 | |
| Westcliffe | | | Kent | | |
| Whale Head | | Sanday | Orkney Islands | HY7590546125 | |
| Worth Matravers | | Swanage | Dorset | SY967777 | |
| Wylfa | 76 | | Isle of Anglesey | SH3522093385 | |

== See also ==
- History of radar
- Acoustic mirror
- Battle of the Beams
- British military history of World War II
- Chain Home Low
- Civilian Technical Corps
- Ground-controlled interception
- ROTOR
- RAF Air Defence Radar Museum
- Castles in the Sky (film)
