= RAF Air Defence Radar Museum =

Military museum in Norfolk, United Kingdom

Coordinates: 52°42′51″N 01°28′15″E

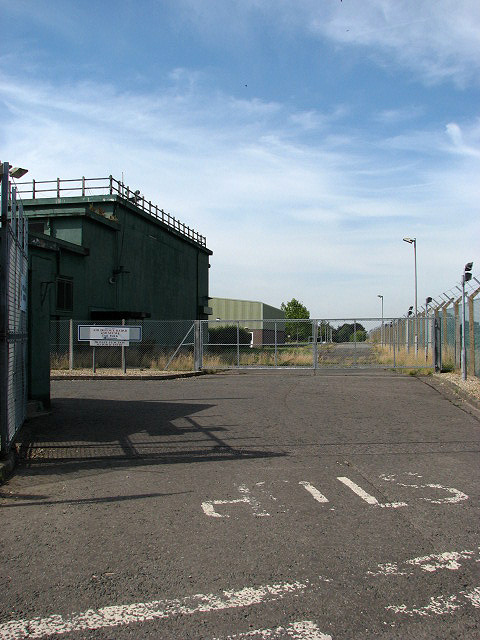
Radar Museum entrance

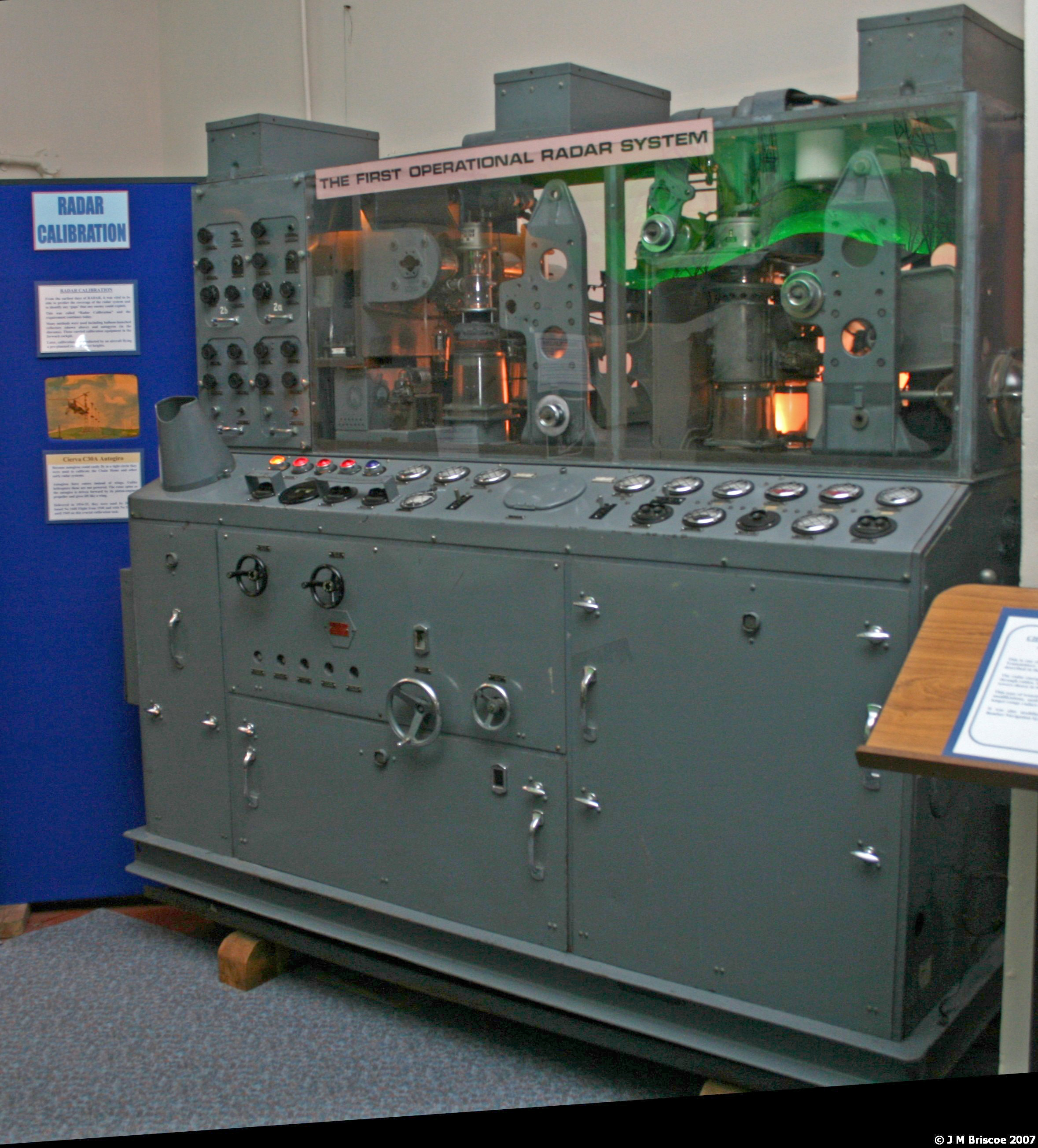
Chain Home transmitter

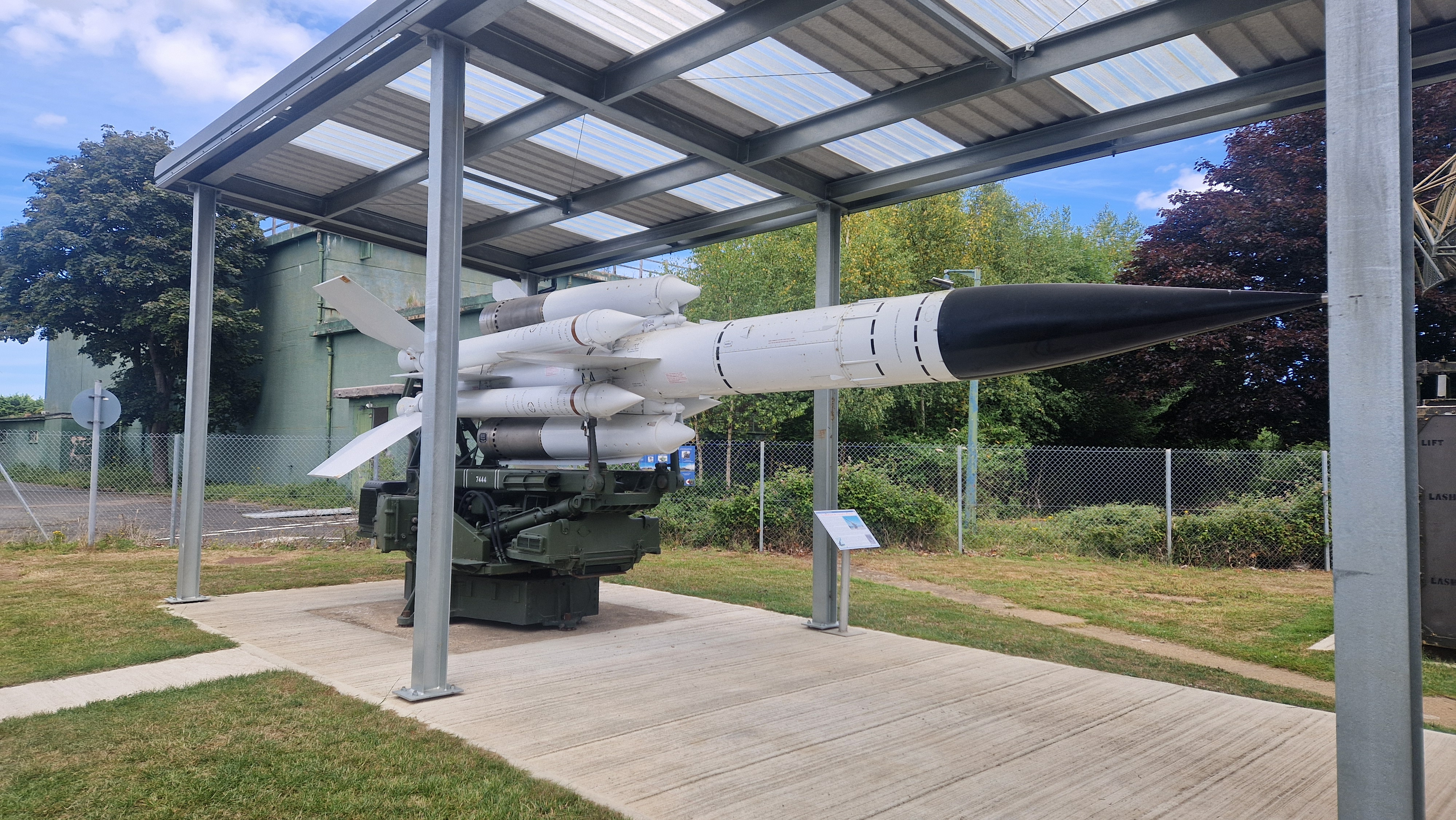
Bloodhound missile in the car park

The Royal Air Force Air Defence Radar Museum is a museum on the site of the former Royal Air Force radar and control base RAF Neatishead, close to the village of Horning in Norfolk, England.

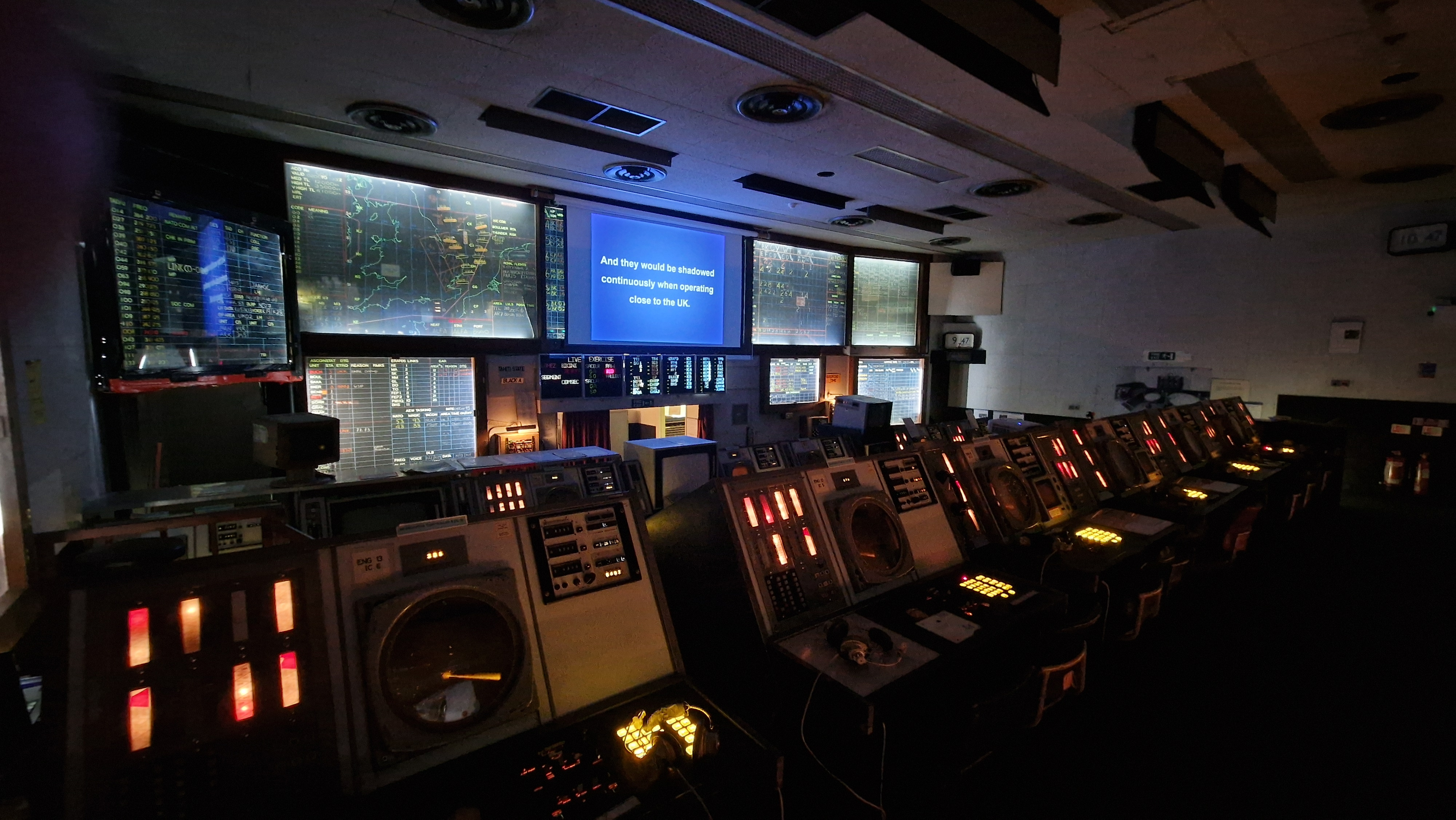
Cold War Operations Room

The museum's exhibitions cover the history of air defence in the United Kingdom, in particular the development of radar from the 1930s until the end of the Cold War. The museum includes a complete Cold War-era Operations Room from which the air defence of Britain was conducted for several decades, as well as many examples of original radar and communications equipment, and an exhibit of a Royal Observer Corps Nuclear Reporting Post. There is also a gallery devoted to the history of the nearby RAF Coltishall.

The Museum is largely staffed by volunteers, many of whom served previously in the RAF.

The Museum is a registered charity, number 1058887.
