= Bodham =

Village in Norfolk, England

Coordinates: 52.916°N 1.163°E

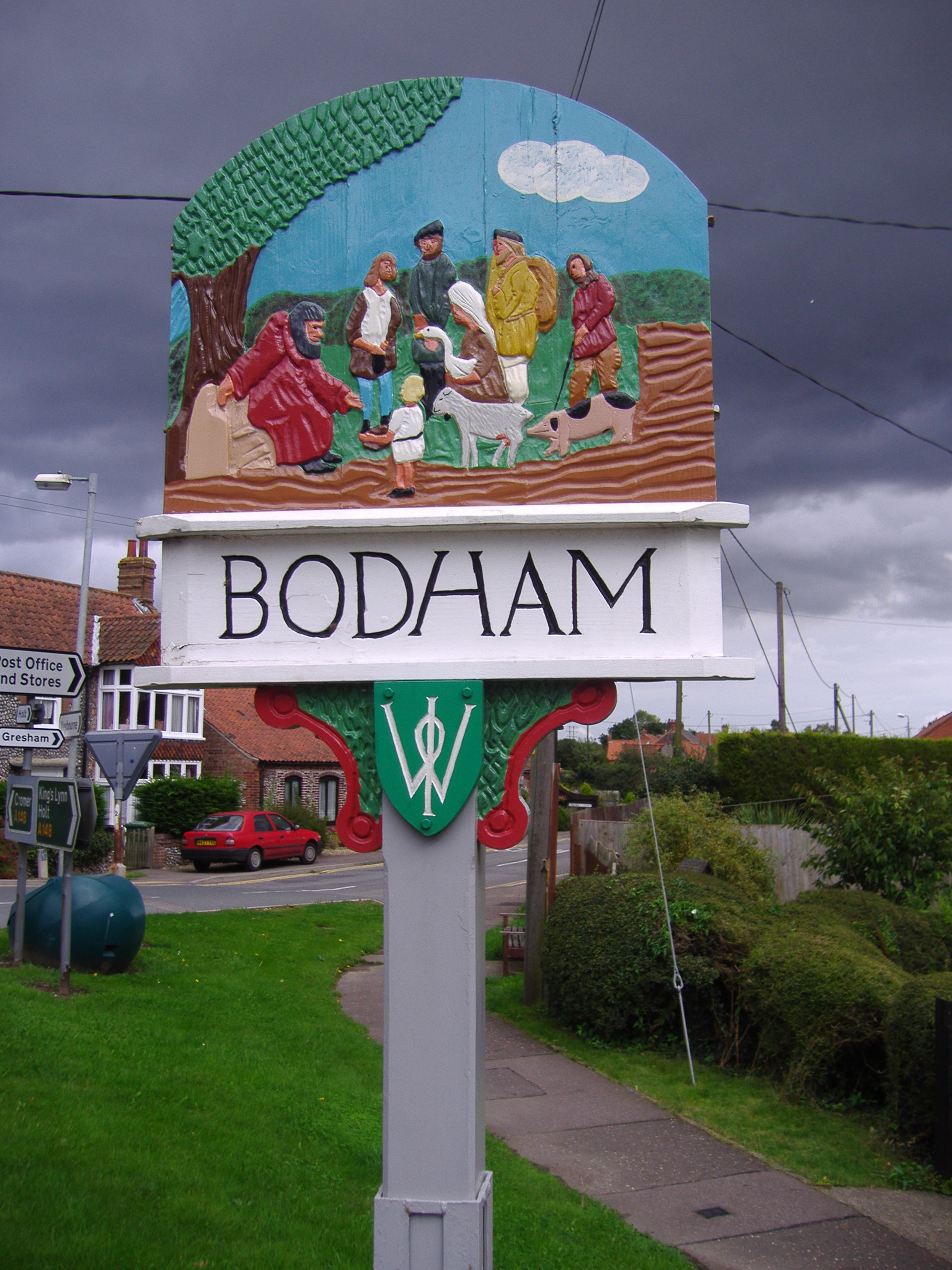
- The Village sign, Bodham, Norfolk

- Location within Norfolk
- Area: 6.80 km^{2} (2.63 sq mi)
- Population: 479 (parish, 2021 census)
  - Density: 70/km^{2} (180/sq mi)
- OS grid reference: TG120400
  - London: 131 miles (211 km)
- Civil parish: Bodham CP
- District: North Norfolk
- Shire county: Norfolk
- Region: East
- Country: England
- Sovereign state: United Kingdom
- Post town: HOLT
- Postcode district: NR25
- Dialling code: 01263
- Police: Norfolk
- Fire: Norfolk
- Ambulance: East of England
- UK Parliament: North Norfolk

Bodham is a village and civil parish in the English county of Norfolk. It is 2.6 miles (4.2 km) south-west of Sheringham, 3.1 miles (5.0 km) north-east of Holt and 21 miles (34 km) north of Norwich.

== History ==
Bodham's name is of Anglo-Saxon origin. In the Domesday Book, it is listed as a settlement of 21 households in the hundred of Holt divided between the estates of Hugh de Montfort and Walter Giffard.

== Geography ==
According to data from the 2021 census, Bodham has a population of 479 people which decreased from the 484 people listed in the 2011 census. The A148 road between King's Lynn and Cromer runs through the village. The nearest railway station is at Sheringham for the Bittern Line which runs between Cromer and Norwich. The nearest airport is Norwich International Airport.

== Church ==
Bodham's parish church is medieval in origin and was largely restored in the 19th and 20th-centuries. Within the church is a plain font, a set of royal arms from the reign of Queen Anne, and stained glass windows designed by J & J King. The building is Grade II.

== Amenities ==
The village has a village hall and playing field. A car dealership is located within the parish and there is a public house.

== Governance ==
Bodham is part of the electoral ward of Gresham for local elections and is part of the district of North Norfolk. It is part of the North Norfolk parliamentary constituency.
