= Civilian Technical Corps =

American quasi-military formation of World War II

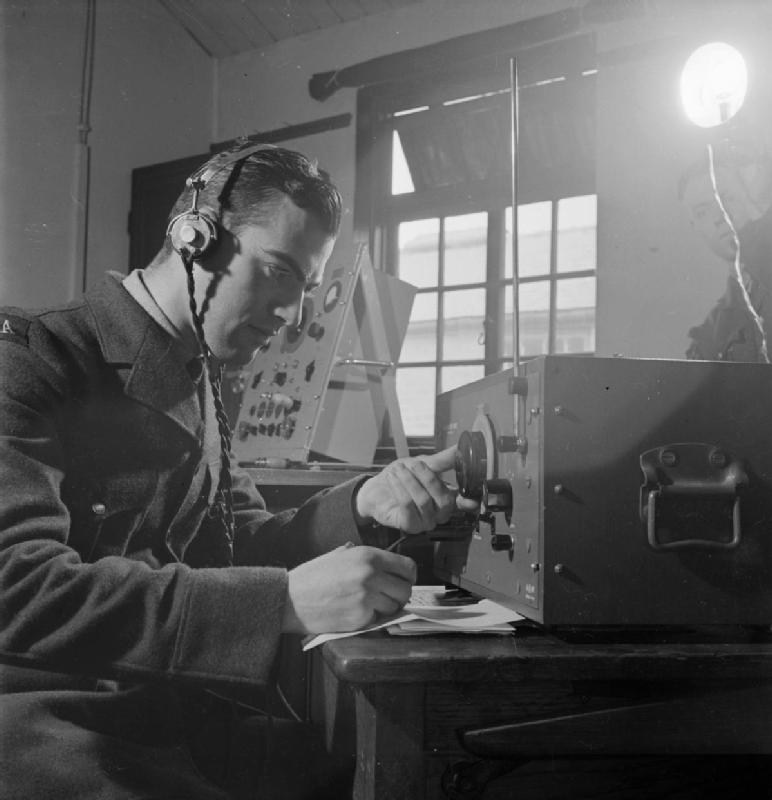
Civilian Technical Corps member training at No. 1 Radio School, RAF Cranwell (1941)

The Civilian Technical Corps was a British quasi-military uniformed organization raised in 1941 in the United States, to directly assist with the war effort within the United Kingdom. It was formed by the Defence (Civilian Technical Corps) Regulations under the Emergency Powers (Defence) Act 1939. The Corps was composed of civilian volunteers. By July 1942 some 931 men had been enrolled, of which 899 arrived in Britain; 19 men had been lost at sea and one was killed in Britain. Almost 300 of the men had returned to the United States by July 1942 on medical grounds or because of the American entry into the war in December 1941.

Their support role was primarily in connection with RADAR and radio, but was extended across a wide range of areas over time. They wore a uniform identical to the wartime Royal Air Force, but with unusual wreath-and-bars non-commissioned rank badges instead of chevrons, of the same design as those issued to members of the Royal Observer Corps, another semi-military air force corps within the UK during the same era.
