= Thunderbird (missile) =

British surface-to-air missile

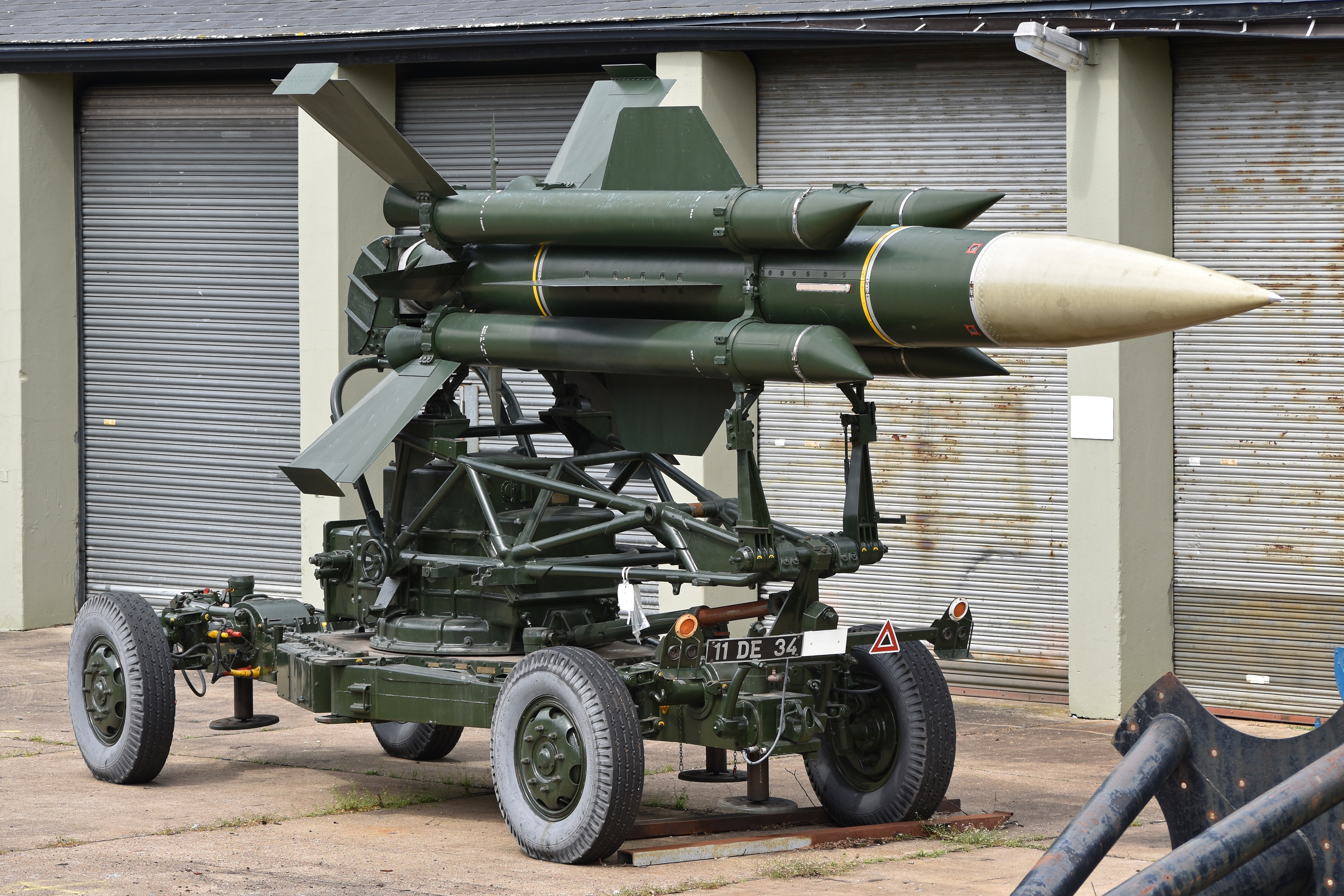
- Thunderbird II at Imperial War Museum Duxford
- Type: Surface-to-air missile
- Place of origin: United Kingdom

Service history
- In service: 1959-1977
- Used by: British Army; Royal Saudi Air Force

Production history
- Manufacturer: English Electric

Specifications
- Length: 20 ft 10 in (6.35 m)
- Diameter: 1 ft 8.7 in (0.527 m)
- Wingspan: 5 ft 4 in (1.63 m)
- Warhead: Continuous-rod HE warhead
- Engine: liquid fuel rocket 4 x Gosling solid fuel rocket
- Maximum speed: Mach 3+
- Guidance system: semi-active radar homing
- Launch platform: Single rail, ground mounted (not mobile)

The English Electric Thunderbird was a British surface-to-air missile produced for the British Army. Thunderbird was primarily intended to attack higher altitude targets at ranges up to approximately 30 miles (48 km), providing wide-area air defence for the Army in the field. Anti-aircraft guns were still used for lower altitude threats. Thunderbird entered service in 1959 and underwent a major mid-life upgrade to Thunderbird 2 in 1966, before being slowly phased out by 1977. Ex-Army Thunderbirds were also operated by the Royal Saudi Air Force after 1967.

Thunderbird had performance similar to other semi-portable missiles like the US MIM-23 Hawk and fully mobile Soviet 2K11 Krug, although it pre-dates both of these systems. After its mid-life upgrades, which shared several components with the RAF's Bristol Bloodhound, Thunderbird featured a continuous-wave radar semi-active homing system that was highly resistant to radar jamming and deception, and was able to track targets even at very low altitudes.

Thunderbird was the Army's only heavy anti-aircraft missile. By the 1960s, the widespread introduction of missile systems like Thunderbird made flight at medium and higher altitudes practically suicidal, and nap-of-the-earth flying became the norm. Against low-altitude targets, the long lock-on time of the Thunderbird's radars and overall slow launch times were not useful against fleeting targets, and shorter-range, faster acting systems were needed. Thunderbird's role was taken over by the much smaller Rapier missile as it became available.

== History ==
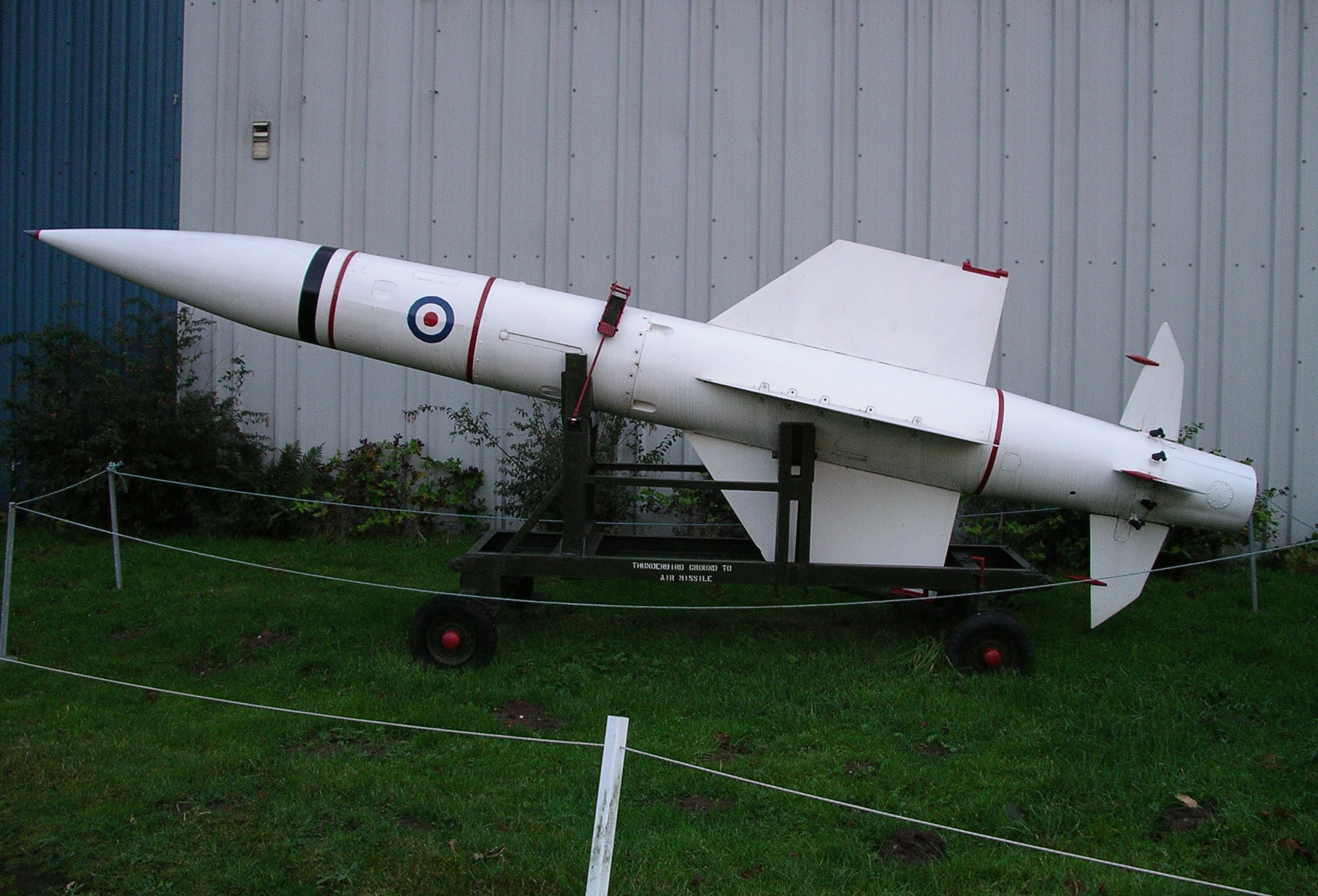
A Thunderbird I missile minus finned-boosters, a museum exhibit at the Midland Air Museum, England.

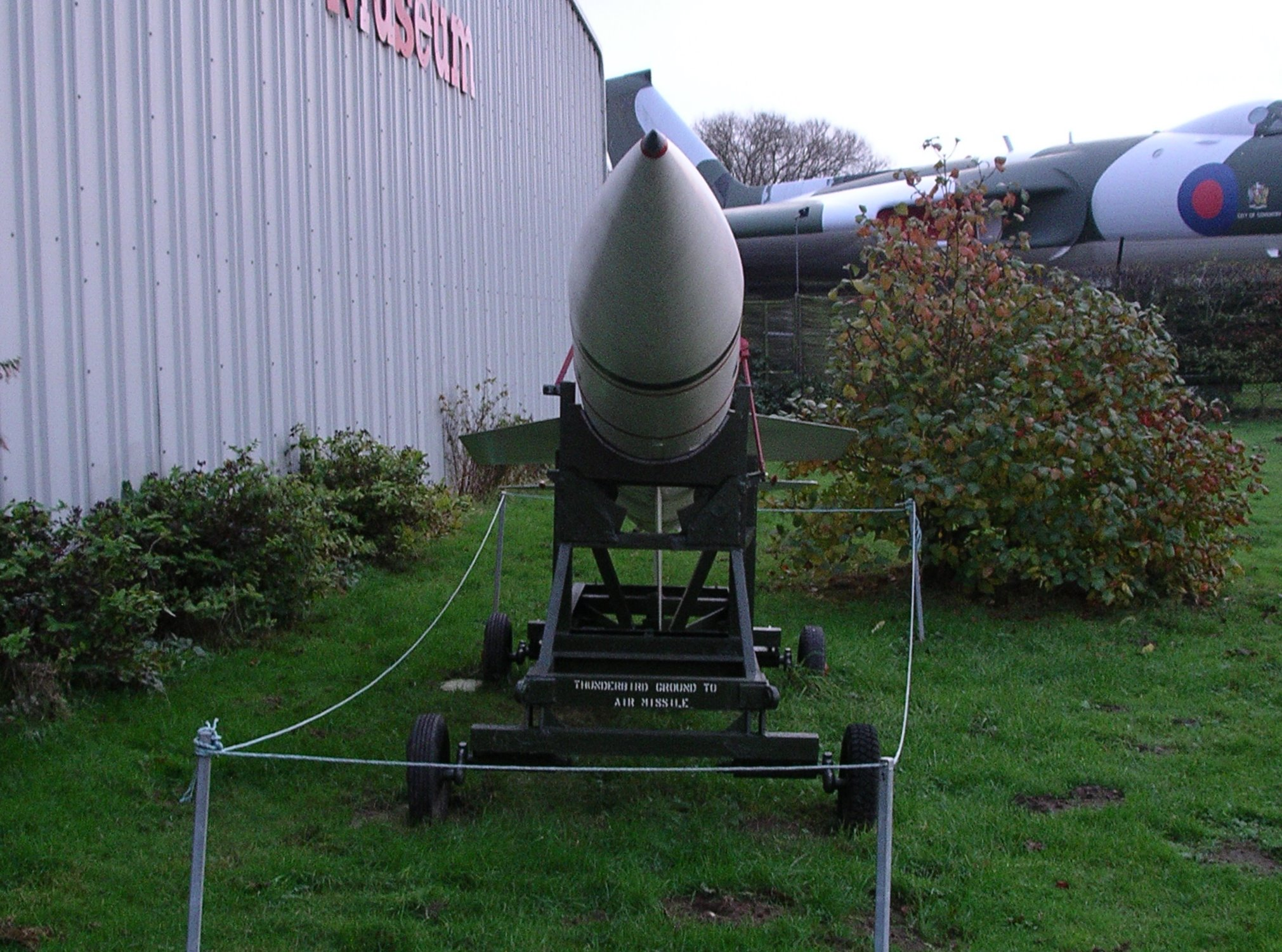
Thunderbird missile (front)

=== Seaslug and Red Heathen ===
Thunderbird traces its history to the 1947 reorganisation of British missile projects. At the time there was a wide variety of concepts under study among various groups in the British Army, Royal Navy and Royal Air Force. All of these were handed to the Ministry of Supply (MoS) with the Royal Aircraft Establishment (RAE) providing technical direction.

Among the projects inherited by the RAE was a 1943 Navy effort to develop surface-to-air missiles (SAMs) to shoot down aircraft carrying glide bombs and anti-shipping missiles before they could reach firing range. In March 1944, a panel known as the GAP Committee formed within the MoS to consider this and similar designs from the Army. The group was reformed several times, growing each time as the topic grew more important. From their work the LOPGAP experimental design emerged, short for "Liquid Oxygen and Petrol Guided Anti-aircraft Projectile". Armstrong Whitworth won a contract to develop its liquid-fueled rocket engine.

The Navy's initial design was reformulated several times as the threat evolved from propeller-driven medium bombers to jet-powered strike aircraft, but remained largely the same in terms of performance; it called for a missile using beam riding guidance on the Navy's Type 909 radar with range on the order of 30,000–60,000 yards (17–34 miles) and capability against subsonic aircraft. This was renamed Seaslug in 1947, shortly before being moved to the RAE. The RAE was interested in seeing ramjet technology applied to this role, and asked de Havilland to submit an entry for Seaslug as well. They were too busy working with Red Hawk, so the contract was offered to Bristol Aerospace instead.

The GAP committee also considered the needs of the Army and Air Force, based on the same technology but aimed at higher performance aircraft and longer ranges on the order of 100,000 yards (57 miles). As a new project, it was assigned a name under the newly-introduced MoS rainbow code, "Red Heathen". English Electric won the development contract.

=== Stage Plan ===
Due to the way radar signals spread out in space with increasing range, beam riding is only useful at shorter ranges, and a paper produced by the RAE suggested that there was no way Red Heathen's accuracy requirements could be met with existing radars. This meant new Gun Laying radars would have to be developed for this role, and that, in turn, led to a re-evaluation of the Red Heathen concept.

The MoS re-evaluated the missile program and split it into two "Stages". Red Heathen re-emerged in 1949 as a semi-active radar homing system with the same required range as Seaslug. Bristol's ramjet-powered Seaslug design was redirected to this new requirement instead of Navy use. A single set of radars would be used with both designs, this consisted of a Ferranti developed tactical control radar and the RRDE's "Yellow River" fire control radar built by British Thomson-Houston.

In 1952 the projects were split, with Bristol's effort becoming "Red Duster" and English Electric's becoming "Red Shoes". These would fill the Stage 1 requirement, along with existing early warning radars and the Gloster Javelin interceptor aircraft. The original Red Heathen concept for a much longer-ranged weapon became "Green Sparkler" and then "Blue Envoy", and relegated to Stage 2 deployment in the 1960s along with newer radars and interceptor aircraft.

=== Development ===
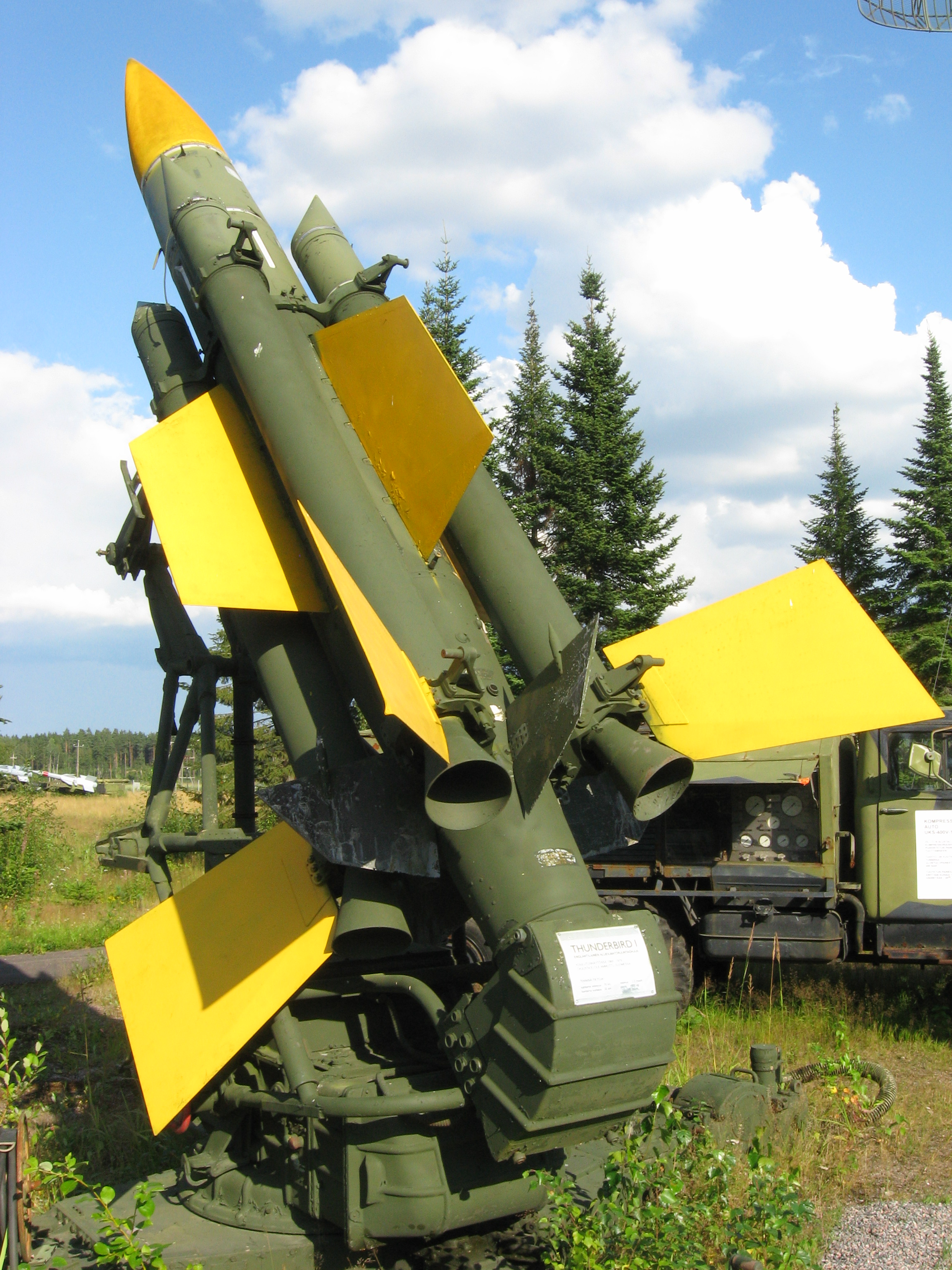
Colourful display of Thunderbird II airframe in Anti-Aircraft Museum, Tuusula, Finland. Note the changes to the main fins.

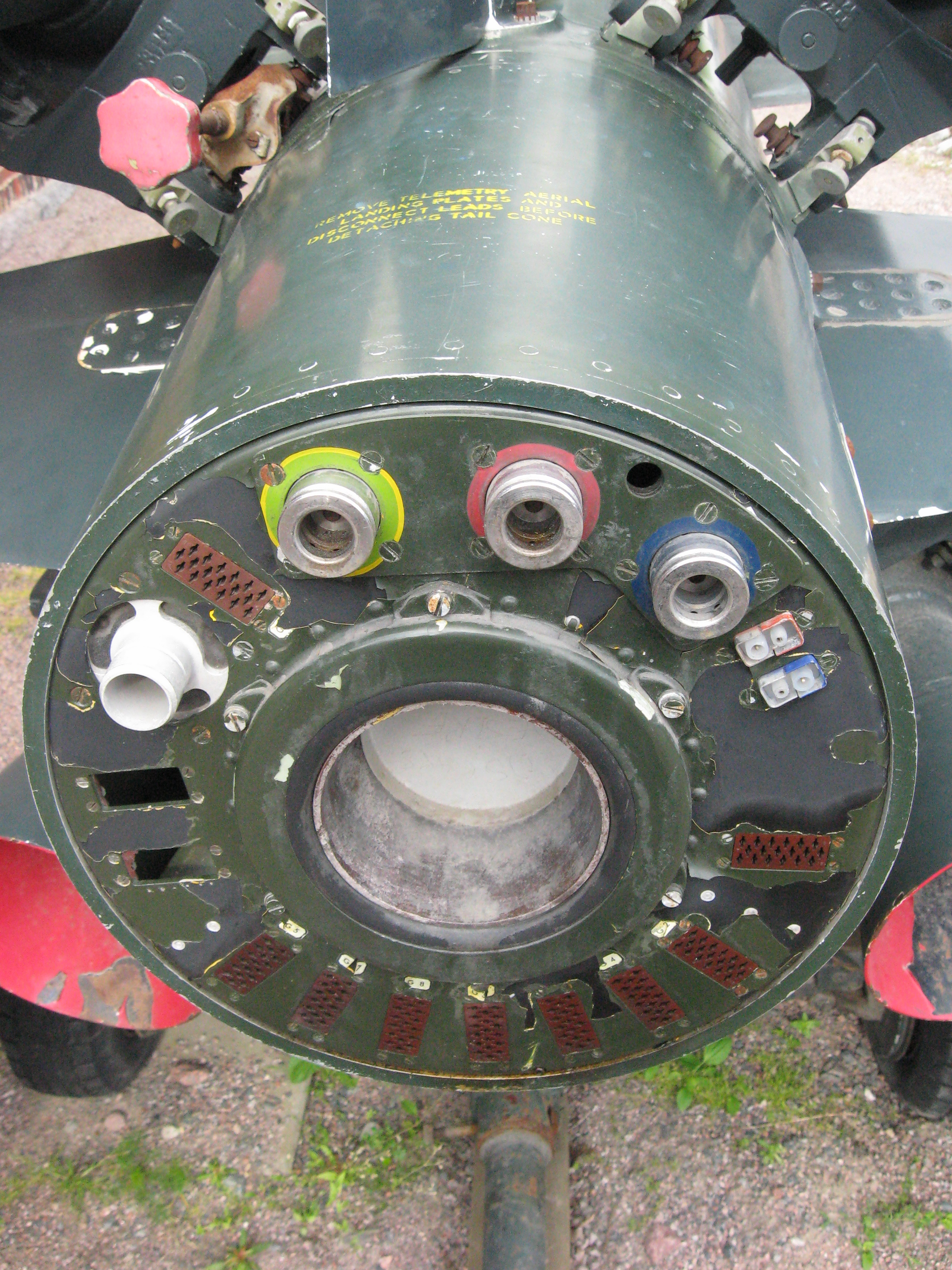
Missile rear end connector details. The Artillery Museum of Finland, Hämeenlinna.

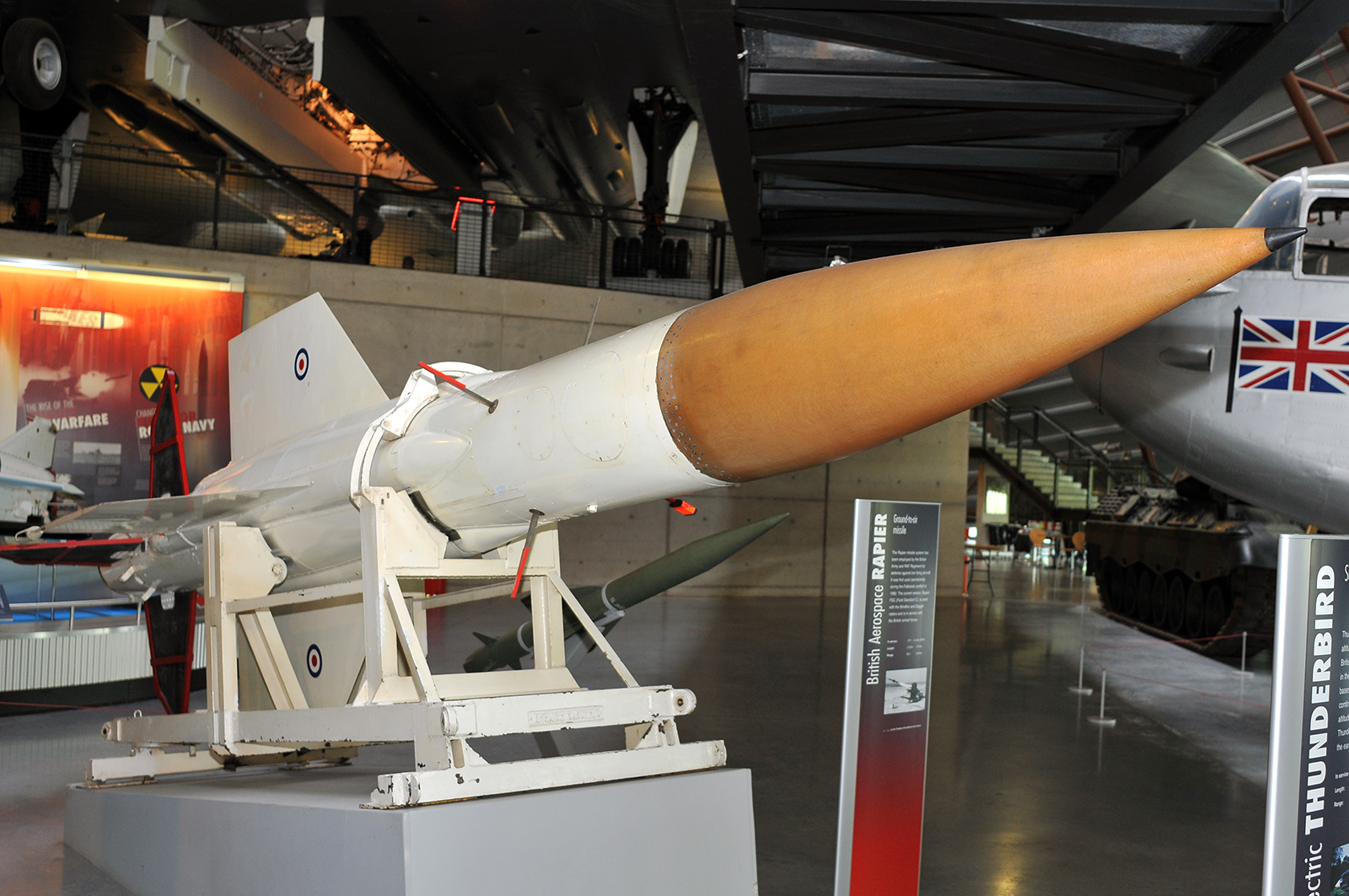
Thunderbird at RAF Museum Cosford

EE's design quickly developed into a fairly simple cylindrical fuselage with an ogive nose cone, four cropped-delta wings just behind the middle point of the fuselage, and four smaller control surfaces at the rear, in-line with the mid-mounted wings. The fuselage had a slight boat-tail narrowing at the extreme rear under the control surfaces.

The sustainer was to be a liquid fuel rocket developed for the missile, and was launched by four large "Gosling" solid fuel rocket boosters lying between the control surfaces and wings. The boosters featured a single oversized fin of their own, and have the notable feature of a small flat surface at the end of every fin. This surface provided an outward drag component that help pull the booster away from the main body when released, helped by the booster's asymmetrical nose cone. Guidance was via semi-active radar homing, the Ferranti Type 83 "Yellow River" pulsed radar serving both as an acquisition and illumination system. The same radar was used with the competing Red Duster.

The test programme used development vehicles D1 to D4. D1 and D2 established some of the basic configuration issues, whilst D3 and D4 were used to test the aerodynamics of the design. The Army rejected the idea of using a liquid fuel rocket because of the difficulty in handling the highly reactive fuel in the field, so a solid rocket sustainer had to be chosen instead. Several different models of sustainer were tried, most of them known as the "Luton Test Vehicle", or LTV.

While testing of the Red Shoes was underway, the "competition" in the form of Red Duster was also entering testing. Red Duster demonstrated several serious problems, and the Army ended any interest in it. In the end the Red Duster problems were sorted out fairly quickly, and it entered service slightly before Red Shoes, as the Bristol Bloodhound Mk. I.

The production Red Shoes missile was officially named Thunderbird. It entered service in 1959 and equipped 36 and 37 Heavy Air Defence Regiments, Royal Artillery. In the Territorial Army (United Kingdom) 457th (Wessex) Heavy Anti-Aircraft Regiment, Royal Artillery also used Thunderbird. It was the first British-designed and produced missile to go into service with the British Army.

=== Further development ===
While development of the Stage 1 missiles was still ongoing, work on the Stage 2 systems was proving to be too far in advance of the state of the art to realistically enter service while the Red Duster and Red Shoes were still useful. In the meantime, advances in radar technology were proceeding rapidly, so it was decided to produce interim designs using new continuous wave radars which would dramatically improve the performance of the existing missiles.

In the case of the Thunderbird, the "Stage 1½" design was known as "Green Flax", and after some paperwork with that name on it was lost and assumed compromised, "Yellow Temple". It utilised the new Type 86 "Indigo Corkscrew" radar. In service it was known as Radar, AD, No 10 (fire control). The new radar greatly improved performance against low-level targets, as well as providing considerably better performance against electronic countermeasures.

To support Thunderbird operations in the field the regiments were equipped with the new Radar, AD, No 11 (tactical control, usually called 'Big Ears') and Radar, AD, No 12 (height finder, usually called 'Noddy') radar, giving them a longer range surveillance system. These radars were also known to Marconi as the S303 and S404, or to the RAF as AMES Type 88 and Type 89. After leaving Army service in 1977 they were turned over to the RAF who used them for tactical control.

Several changes to the basic missile were undertaken as well. Although the size remained the same, the new version featured much larger boosters, larger mid-mounted wings with sweep on the front and back, and a new nose cone with a much higher fineness ratio. The boosters lost their asymmetrical nose cones, but the surfaces on the end of their fins grew much larger. Overall the missile still looked much like the Mk. I version, as opposed to the Bloodhound which became much larger as it was upgraded.

The improved missile was known in service as Thunderbird 2. They entered service in 1966 and were removed in 1977.

== Operators ==
=== Former ===
United Kingdom
British Army

- 36 and 37 HAA Regiments RA (regular)
- 324th (Northumbrian) Heavy Anti-Aircraft Regiment, Royal Artillery
- 457th (Wessex) Heavy Anti-Aircraft Regiment, Royal Artillery

Finland
Finnish Army - planned purchase of either Thunderbird or Bloodhound was eventually cancelled, but only after deactivated training missiles had been delivered in the late 1960s. These were used in the training role until 1979.
Saudi Arabia
Royal Saudi Air Force - 37 second-hand Thunderbird I missiles purchased in 1967

=== Potential ===
Negotiations were also held with Libya and Zambia.

== Survivors ==
Thunderbird remains a popular museum item in the UK. One of the missiles is now displayed outside the Midland Air Museum, Warwickshire, England. There is also one on display at the Royal School of Artillery in Larkhill. A Thunderbird Mk1 is also on display at the National Museum of Flight located at East Fortune, just outside Edinburgh, Scotland. A Thunderbird is also stationed outside the Combined Services Military Museum at Maldon in Essex. A Thunderbird nose cone and parts of main body on display at Predannack Anti-Aircraft Battery and museum, Cornwall, UK A Thunderbird without launch pad can be seen at Capel Military Show, Surrey UK Two of the Finnish missiles survive, one missile is located in Museo Militaria, Hämeenlinna, another in the Anti-aircraft Museum, Tuusula.

A Thunderbird is displayed in Woomera township of the Woomera Rocket Range, South Australia.

A Thunderbird missile without boosters is also displayed as the gate guardian at Westcott Venture Park, formerly the Rocket Propulsion Establishment, where the boosters Gosling solid rocket motors and Smoky Joe sustainer motors were developed and filled.

== Specifications ==
- Length: 6.35 m
- Body Diameter: 0.527 m
- Fin Span: 1.63 m
- Warheads: Continuous HE rod
- Speed: Mach 2.7
- Range: 75 km

== See also ==
- Bristol Bloodhound - a similar weapon adopted by the RAF
- Hawker Siddeley Seaslug - a similar weapon adopted by the Royal Navy
- List of Rainbow Codes
