= Blue Envoy =

- Type: Surface-to-air missile
- Place of origin: United Kingdom

Service history
- In service: Never entered service

Production history
- Designed: 1950s
- Manufacturer: Bristol Aeroplane Co.

Specifications
- Warhead: Continuous-rod warhead Possible small nuclear
- Detonation mechanism: Proximity fuse
- Engine: 2× Bristol BRJ.811 ramjets, 4× Borzoi solid fuel boosters
- Operational range: 150 miles (240 km)
- Maximum speed: Mach 3
- Guidance system: Semi-active radar homing
- Launch platform: Fixed installation

Blue Envoy (a Rainbow Code name) was a British project to develop a ramjet-powered surface-to-air missile. It was tasked with countering supersonic bomber aircraft launching stand-off missiles, and thus had to have very long range and high-speed capabilities. The final design was expected to fly at Mach 3 (3,700 km/h; 2,300 mph) with a maximum range of over 200 miles (320 km).

Development started as Green Sparkler sometime in the early 1950s. (Note: No specific date is given in any of the available sources.) Green Sparkler featured active radar homing, but it was quickly decided this was beyond the state of the art. Replacing the active homing with semi-active radar homing produced Blue Envoy. Green Sparkler and Blue Envoy were otherwise similar, and were similar to the US CIM-10 Bomarc as well.

Test launches of sub-scale models were carried out successfully, and development of the new ramjet engines and seeker electronics was well advanced when the project was cancelled in April 1957 as part of the 1957 Defence White Paper. Its cancellation made Blue Envoy "possibly the most enigmatic project in the field of 1950s United Kingdom weapons development."

An impromptu meeting between the contractors led to a proposal to use the guidance system and ramjets to upgrade the Bloodhound Mk. I missile design. This private proposal was accepted and became Bloodhound Mk. II, which increased range from 35 miles (56 km) to 75 miles (121 km) and offered much greater performance against low-level targets and radar jamming efforts. The Bloodhound Mk. II would ultimately serve as Britain's primary air defence missile into the 1990s.

== History ==
=== ROTOR plan ===
During the late 1940s a series of events prompted the complete reformation of the British air defence system. This led to ROTOR, which was designed to provide widespread radar coverage of the entire British Isles and defend that airspace using a combination of interceptor aircraft and anti-aircraft artillery.

In 1953, as part of continual modifications to the ROTOR concept, the anti-aircraft artillery was to be replaced by surface-to-air missiles (SAMs), or as they are known in the UK, surface-to-air guided weapons (SAGW). As SAMs were new technology, it was planned these would be deployed in two stages, an interim Stage 1 design with range on the order of 20 miles (32 km), and some time after that, a greatly improved Stage 2 missile with much longer range. Stage 1 was intended to counter subsonic jet-powered bombers dropping nuclear bombs, Stage 2 would be needed in the future to counter supersonic bombers launching standoff missiles from long range.

Two designs were entered for the Stage 1 missile contract, English Electric's Red Shoes and Bristol Aerospace's Red Duster. The Royal Aircraft Establishment (RAE), who was in overall control of missile development, was interested in seeing ramjet propulsion developed, and suggested Red Duster move to this form of power. Otherwise the two systems were very similar designs, even sharing the same Marconi designed radar systems. Red Shoes emerged as the 30 miles (48 km) ranged Thunderbird, while Red Duster became the 40 miles (64 km) ranged Bloodhound.

=== Green Sparkler ===
Work on the Stage 2 missile did not begin until sometime later, initially under the name Green Sparkler. Stage 2 was tasked with effectively countering bomber aircraft flying at supersonic speeds at very high altitudes that were potentially launching stand-off missiles from hundreds of miles range. In order to stop these attacks before they reached their launching points, the missile had to have long range. This, in turn, demanded high speed as there would only be a short time between detection on radar and the aircraft reaching their launching areas.

Green Sparkler had a design range of over 200 nautical miles (370 km; 230 mi). This was beyond what could be effectively guided using a semi-active radar homing like the systems used on Thunderbird and Bloodhound. Instead, Green Sparkler used command guidance for much of the mission, switching to an active radar seeker in the last 10 miles (16 km) of the approach. Two seekers were considered, one using a continuous wave radar with separate transmit and receive dishes in the nose, and another using a pulse doppler radar using a single dish. Both were to also offer home-on-jamming.

Some consideration was given to using the US's BOMARC for the Stage 2 role. This was ultimately rejected; while the BOMARC had the desired active radar seeker, it was (at that time) a simple non-doppler pulse unit that would be very easy to jam using the recently introduced carcinotron. They also considered the 300 nautical miles (560 km; 350 mi) range excessive, given that the AMES Type 80 radars that would be providing initial aiming had a range of just over 200 nmi, meaning this very large missile's range performance would be somewhat wasted.

As the Soviets introduced new bomber designs, it appeared that there would be a period in the late 1950s where the Stage 1 missiles would not be adequate while the Stage 2 missile would still be under development. This led to the introduction of the "vulgar fractions"; Stage 1 1/2 and Stage 1 3/4. Stage 1 1/2 was an updated Thunderbird with new radars, while Stage 1 3/4 was a slightly modified version of Green Sparkler using semi-active guidance instead of an active seeker and thus offering a shorter maximum range on the order of 150 nautical miles (280 km; 170 mi).

This shorter-range proposal became Blue Envoy. By this time the Royal Navy was concerned about similar stand-off missile attacks against their ships. They developed a requirement for a similar long-range missile. Bristol submitted Blue Envoy for this role, and it was the only entry for this contest.

=== Blue Envoy ===
Although Blue Envoy, and Green Sparkler, shared many broadly similar features with the Red Duster, it was an entirely different design in detail. In order to deal with the skin friction heating of its Mach 3 performance, the entire missile was made of stainless steel rather than aluminium. The speed was measured by a thermometer, adjusting the ramjet power to keep the skin temperature under 620 °F (327 °C). To reach those speeds, a larger 18 inches (460 mm) diameter ramjet engine was required. Overall, the fuselage was not much larger than Red Duster, and did not carry appreciably more fuel.

To reach the required range, increased from Red Duster's 40 miles (64 km) to Blue Envoy's 150 miles (240 km), the missile did not fly directly at its targets. Instead, it was "lofted" on a near-vertical ascent into the high atmosphere, where it then tipped over to horizontal where it could coast in the thin air for long distances. The thin air at these altitudes made controlling the missile difficult, and while Blue Envoy retained Red Duster's "twist-n-steer" guidance system, it had much larger tailless compound delta wings in place of the original smaller clipped delta wings and separate tail surfaces. Vertical stabilizers were mounted about 2/3 along the wing span, closer to the tips.

The initial layout, developed by Dietrich Küchemann, had the main portion of the wing swept at 75 degrees, lowered to 42 degrees outboard of the vertical stabilizers. Wind tunnel testing demonstrated that this layout caused interference with the air intakes for the engines. Roy Hawkins of the Royal Aircraft Establishment experimented with many different planforms before adding a further forward extension of the wing with an initial sweep at 82 degrees before meeting the original layout aft the engine inlets.

Controlling the missile during its initial launch and climb was also a difficult problem. Normally, missiles use some form of proportional navigation, an algorithm that determines a near-perfect interception vector based on nothing more than the angular velocity of the target relative to the missile. Blue Envoy was designed to be launched long before the target became visible to the missile's radar receiver and thus had to use command guidance for an extended period of flight. Computers on the ground would send signals to the missile to fly it toward the approximate intercept location, and then as it approached, feed it information on where to look for the target.

Ferranti began the development of a small digital computer to perform these intercept calculations. The computer would be fed the target location from a new tactical control radar under development as Orange Yeoman. The computer would then calculate an approximate intercept point and feed that information to the missile's autopilot. The computer also sent the current angular location of the target relative to the missile, the "angle error", so the missile could keep its radar receiver aimed in the right direction, listening for the signal of the guidance radar. Some thought was also given to using the computer to directly control the missile's control surfaces, perhaps only during testing.

The main warhead developed for Blue Envoy was a continuous rod warhead, although some consideration was given to a small nuclear warhead under the code name "Blue Fox", which weighed about 450 pounds (200 kg) and had a yield around 5 to 10 kiloton. Another weapon being developed for the missile role was "Pixie", even smaller at around 250 pounds (110 kg) and 1 kiloton.

=== Cancellation ===
By 1957 the programme had defined the final shape of the missile and flown sub-scale models, had completed development and test-flown the 18" engines on the Bristol XTV.9, renamed BET.9 for Blue Envoy Test, and the new radars were about to enter production. Although there were no remaining issues to solve and production could begin, in April 1957 the project was cancelled as part of the suggestions of the 1957 Defence White Paper.

Up to this time, UK war plans were based on the concept of the three-day war, in which a Warsaw Pact attack was met with the use of tactical nuclear weapons. The war would be won or lost long before the Warsaw Pact forces reached the English Channel, so a conventional invasion was simply not a consideration. At any time, the war might "go strategic" and would be fought between Soviet bombers and RAF interceptors; the interceptors would either destroy the bombers hundreds of miles from shore, or the UK would be destroyed.

The White Paper considered the effects of the introduction of nuclear-armed ballistic missiles to these warfighting scenarios. The UK was within the range of medium range ballistic missiles (MRBMs) stationed in East Germany, which had a flight time on the order of 15 minutes or less. Unlike the larger ICBMs, these medium-range missiles were simple and cheap, and it was expected they would be the main form of attack after mid-1960s. There was no credible scenario where the Soviets would use only bombers; if an attack by bombers was detected, this would only signal that missiles were already on the way.

As there was no defence against ballistic missiles, the only possible counter was deterrence. The UK's V bomber deterrent was highly vulnerable while on the ground, so any signal of an attack required their immediate launch. In such an environment, defence systems like Blue Envoy did not make much sense; in any scenario where the Blue Envoy might be used against bombers, the V bombers would have to be launched anyway because missiles were sure to follow. In that case, you have to launch on warning and that would leave Blue Envoy defending empty airfields. The logic was considered so convincing that any attempt to defend the deterrent force was eventually abandoned.

There were also problems with the design itself. Experiments with stainless steel construction on the Bristol 188 had demonstrated this material was much more difficult to work with than expected. Further, the Navy was planning a new series of smaller ships, and Blue Envoy would be too large to be carried by them. Having originally developed the Seaslug to fit smaller ships, its development into a system far too large for many ships made the Navy wary of another large missile design. Moreover, both the Navy and RAF were watching the shift from high-altitude bombers to lower-altitude strike aircraft, where the massive performance of the Blue Envoy would not be particularly useful as the radar horizon might be on the order of 10 miles (16 km).

=== Bloodhound Mark II ===
The cancellation of Blue Envoy caught Bristol by surprise, and they had no other ongoing projects to keep the missile division running. Don Rowley, Director of the Guided Weapons Division, was quoted saying:

When Blue Envoy was cancelled we were on our beam-ends: that was our most dangerous period. I can remember Bloodhound II being invented in a taxi outside Ferranti's office.

At the time of its cancellation, development of its radar systems and ramjet engines was largely complete. Bristol and Ferranti engineers came up with the plan of using these parts of Blue Envoy on a new version of Red Duster - by this time known as the Bloodhound - which would offer a reasonable improvement in performance for very low development cost. The proposal proved interesting enough that it was ordered into production despite the very low priority for air defenses after 1957.

The resulting Bloodhound Mark II entered service in 1965. Many changes were made as part of this process. The 18-inch diameter engines from Blue Envoy were added to the design, providing more thrust and allowing higher weights. This capacity was used to increase the fuel storage by extending the missile's fuselage until it was even longer than Blue Envoy. This almost doubled the range from the Mark I's roughly 40 miles (64 km) to about 75 miles (121 km). Another major change was that the seeker now used Blue Envoy's AMES Type 86 and AMES Type 87 radars, which were continuous-wave radars that could track targets very close to the ground and were much more resistant to jamming.

These changes made Bloodhound a much more formidable weapon, and in this form, it served into the 1990s.

=== New Guided Missile ===
Although the RAF no longer believed defence from air attack would be successful, the RN still had a need to fend off attacks by strike aircraft. The cancellation of Blue Envoy left their plans for an advanced wide-area air defence without a weapon. They started the New Guided Missile Program, or NIGS for short, to replace the existing Seaslug missile on the County-class destroyers with a missile of much higher performance and a fire control system and radar that could track multiple targets, similar to the modern Aegis Combat System.

Although NIGS generated some interest in the late 1950s, by 1958 it had already been decided that the need for a modernized shorter range weapon was more urgent. NIGS continued at a lower priority while the new and somewhat simpler Sea Dart was given full development. By September 1959 a small, ramjet-powered upper stage with a large solid-fuel booster had been produced, similar to the contemporary US design, RIM-50 Typhon. There was some literature that suggested NIGS and Typhon would be close enough in size to be interchangeable. Later documents put the range at 150 nm, the same as Blue Envoy, although the missile was much smaller. Carriage of more than 60 missiles were considered in some ship configurations.

== See also ==
Aircraft of comparable role, configuration, and era

- CIM-10 Bomarc, US system of very similar performance
