= Green Mace =

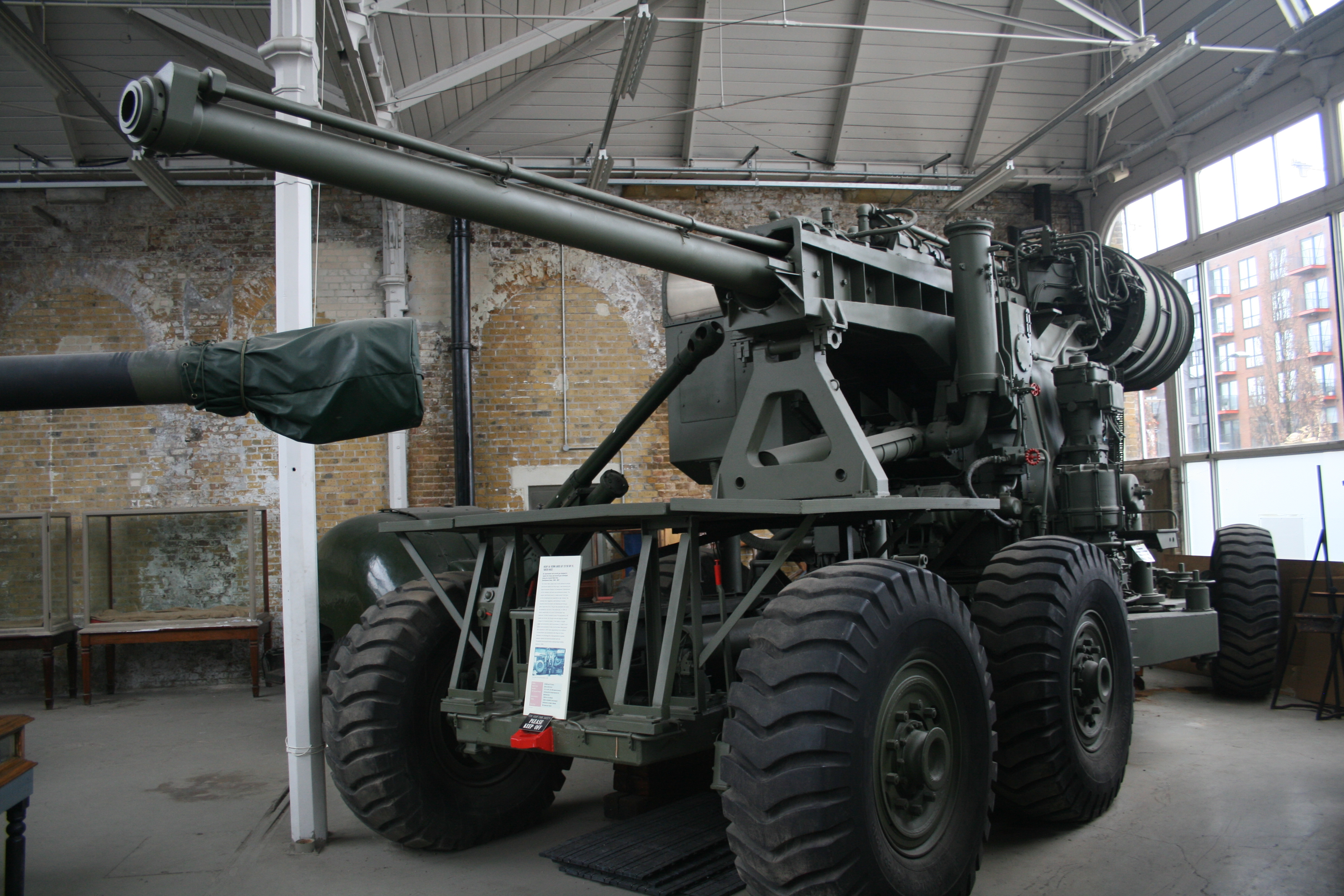
- Green Mace prototype at the Royal Artillery Museum, Woolwich, in 2015.
- Type: Heavy anti-aircraft gun
- Place of origin: United Kingdom

Production history
- Designer: RARDE, Fort Halstead
- Designed: c. 1956
- Manufacturer: Vickers
- Produced: 1956
- No. built: 1

Specifications (Prototype)
- Mass: 28,000 kg (62,000 lb)
- Crew: 1 gunner 10-15 support personnel
- Shell: Folding Fin Discarding Sabot
- Calibre: 102 mm (4.0 in) (test version)
- Barrels: 1 partially-rifled smooth bore
- Action: electric-driven drum feed
- Rate of fire: 96 rounds/minute
- Muzzle velocity: 1,200 metres per second (3,900 ft/s)
- Effective firing range: 7,600 metres (8,300 yd)
- Feed system: twin rotating drums with 14 rounds in each

Green Mace, also known as the QF 127/58 SBT X1, is a prototype British heavy anti-aircraft gun that was developed in the early 1950s. It used a variety of techniques to improve the firing rate and velocity of its projectiles. It was rendered obsolete by the development of the guided surface-to-air missile and thus never entered production, with only a single prototype surviving.

== History ==
Green Mace was the Rainbow Code assigned to the QF 127/58 SBT X1 during its development. The original specifications were for a 127 mm (5.0 in) gun with water-cooled barrel, firing folding-fin discarding sabot dart projectiles. Two rotary magazines, each holding 14 rounds, allowed for a high rate of fire on the order of 75 rounds per minute (RPM).

The gun was developed by Vickers under the direction of the Royal Armaments Research and Development Establishment at Fort Halstead. It demonstrated a firing rate as high as 96 rounds per minute, about six times that of the 8.8 cm Flak 18/36/37/41.

== Development ==
A proof of concept prototype was built with a 102 mm (4.0 in) barrel, but otherwise was as intended. It was mostly automatic and could be operated by a single person sitting in a covered control cabin on the right-hand side of the vehicle. However, the enormous power and ammunition requirements for the piece resulted in it having to have two trailers in support—one for power, and one for ammunition—and a crew with a small crane in order to reload its two ammunition drums. Each drum contained 14 rounds, and the piece fired 80 to 90 rounds per minute (RPM); due to this, reloading was a frequent task. It took a crew between ten and fifteen minutes to fully reload.

With the advent of guided missiles, and the transfer of responsibility for ground-based, static anti-aircraft defence of UK airspace from the British Army to the Royal Air Force, the project was cancelled in 1957.

== Other versions ==
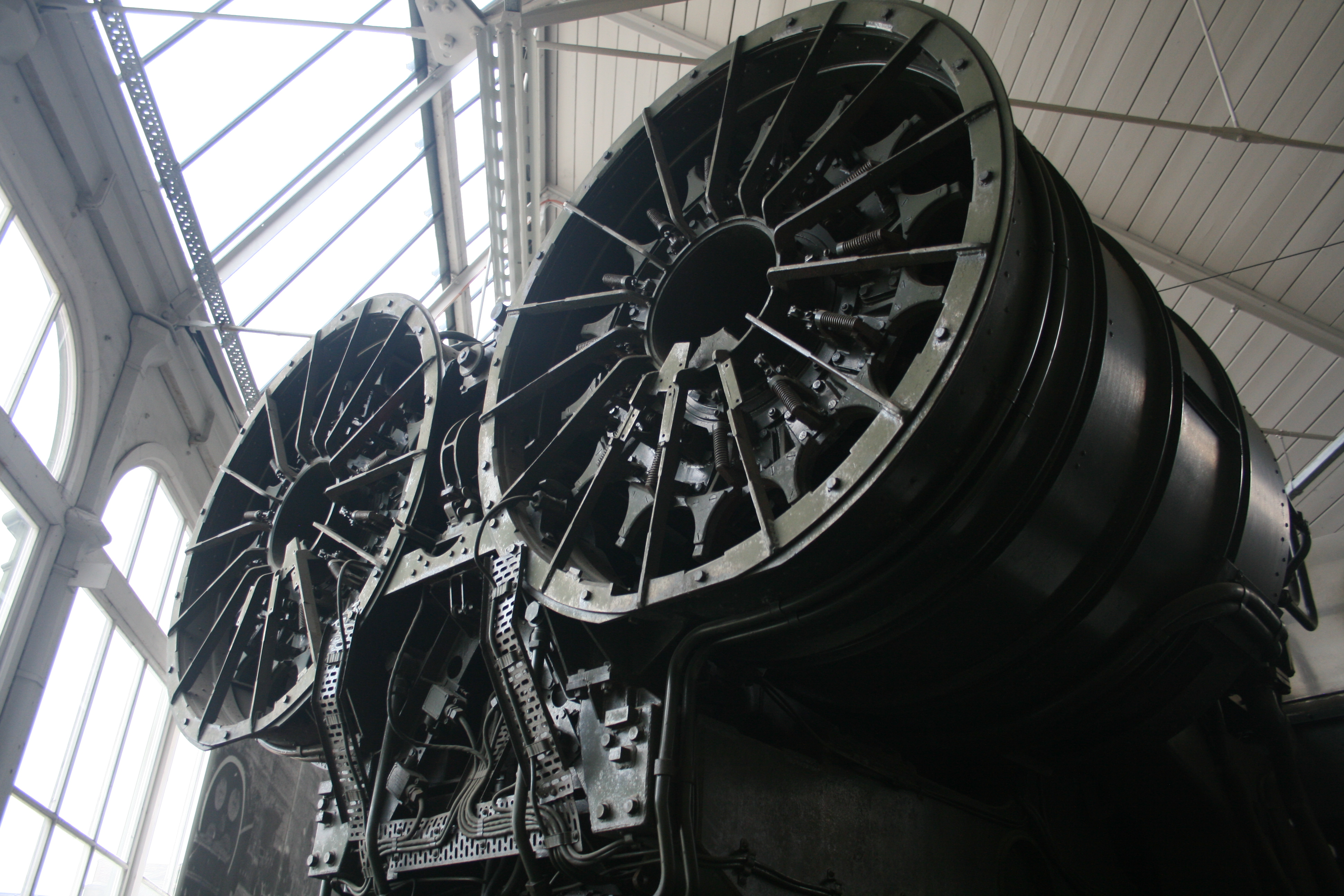
The ammunition drums on the back of Green Mace, holding 14 rounds each.

Some sources suggest that a naval version of Green Mace was planned as a new dual purpose gun for the Royal Navy's destroyers, and a twin version of the same gun intended for cruisers reached the design stage, but neither went any further, and they were cancelled in 1957.

Original work was done on two other projects: Longhand and Ratefixer. Both were of smaller calibre than Green Mace, and were designed to try to increase the rate of fire and calibre used. Similar concepts were also said to have been used in the Red Queen gun, which was essentially a medium-weight version of Green Mace.

== See also ==
- Bloodhound (missile)
- Thunderbird (missile)

=== Weapons of comparable role, performance and era ===
- 130 mm air defense gun KS-30, early 1950s Soviet weapon
- AK-130, 1970s Soviet naval automatic twin gun with rate of fire about the same as Green Mace
- 105mm SFAC, a French anti-aircraft gun developed in late 1940s and abandoned in 1950s
- Lvakan 4501, a Swedish 12cm anti-aircraft gun developed by Bofors in the 1950s, later changed into a naval gun, TAK120
