= Yellow Duckling =

Yellow Duckling was an early development of an infrared linescan camera, developed for the detection of submarines during the Cold War. The name is one of the series of British Rainbow Codes.

The system used an infrared detector placed in front of a magnifying mirror. The entire apparatus spun at 150 rpm to produce horizontal stripes of image. The motion of the patrol aircraft provided the vertical scanning motion, producing a 2D display that moved down the display as the aircraft flew.

The original idea was that a submerged submarine would mix colder water from its depth with the warmer water on the surface, which would produce a visible patch of lower temperature on the surface. In multiple tests, the system proved unable to detect any such temperature difference and the system was not put into production.

== Origins ==
Infrared detection systems had been considered as far back as the 1930s. During World War II, the Germans were the innovators in this field. Studies of captured FuG.280 Kielgerät from a Ju 88G night fighter showed the use of a lead sulphide (PbS) detector. This was developed by the British at TRE into a lead telluride (PbTe) detector and the use of liquid nitrogen cooling to improve sensitivity and extend the lower range of temperatures it could detect. Kielgerät also demonstrated the use of a rotating 'chopper' mirror and a simple form of boxcar integrator to extract a usable signal from a noisy detector.

These early detectors had no scanning or imaging ability: they detected heat sources at a single spot. To make them militarily useful they were generally mounted as part of a 'track-follow' mount, where the detector head could be kept pointing at the target. This work would give rise to the heat-seeking air-to-air missiles such as the Green Thistle seeker for the de Havilland Blue Jay (later Firestreak) and the improved Violet Banner seeker used on Red Top. Another approach being developed with these detectors was that of a star tracker for missile navigation. The Blue Lagoon seeker was developed as part of the Blue Sapphire and Orange Tartan trackers for use in the Blue Moon missile. These seekers scanned from side to side and could measure the position of target stars. It was recognised that if the tracker was turned upside down to point downwards, its scanning would build up a heat picture of the ground map.

== Wake detection ==
Detection of submarines had so far relied on spotting them whilst surfaced. Infrared approaches aimed to spot the heat of their exhaust, whilst running surfaced on diesel engines.

The earlier submarine detectors such as Autolycus or search radar would become ineffective with the Soviet shift to nuclear submarines in the 1960s; which could run submerged, without needing to snorkel. New methods were sought with which to detect a submerged submarine.

Some of these methods detected not the submarine itself, but the disturbances it made in the sea. If its passage mixed layers of cold surface and underlying warm water, this would raise the apparent surface temperature slightly. This temperature change could be detected using an infrared-sensitive thermometer. Although impossible to detect by measuring the temperature in the wake, imaging the temperature of the overall sea would show the wake as standing out from it.

== Description ==
Yellow Duckling began with the Blue Lagoon work, using it as a sea surface scanner in an attempt to detect the disturbed wake of a submerged submarine and its heat signature. The detector element was a 6 mm PbTe square.

In 1953 the first test equipment was flown aboard a Handley Page Hastings, WD484. Later tests would use TG514, after WD484 was lost. (Note: WD484 was lost on 2 March 1955 with two fatalities in a take-off accident from RAF Boscombe Down, when the elevator locks were left engaged.'"`UNIQ--ref-00000000-QINU`"') These later tests were carried out around Malta, hunting HMS Sea Devil, the last of the World War II S-class submarines still in commission. The PbTe detector was found to be capable of detecting a surfaced submarine, but not one submerged, snorkeling nor its wake.

An improved detector was developed, with a new element and new scanner. The detector element was a large 15 mm square of copper-doped germanium, cooled to liquid hydrogen temperatures. This was potentially sensitive to temperature differences of 1/2000 °C. The new scanner used a 24 inches (610 mm) diameter mirror with a 12 inches (300 mm) focal length. The whole assembly, mirror and detector, rotated continuously at 150rpm. Its axis was inclined at 30° to the vertical, to give a view facing forwards and slightly down. Rotation gave a sideways line scan, (Note: This "line scan" motion gave the later infrared linescan systems their name) with the aircraft's motion scanning perpendicular to this.

The new germanium detector was no more sensitive than the earlier PbTe element, but was considered easier to use in service. Its detection results were disappointing: in 1956 trials it only detected around 20% of snorkeling submarines, even when their position was already known. It could not detect a submarine any deeper than 100 feet (30 m). These were in the optimum conditions of the warm, calm Mediterranean at night, rather than the rough Atlantic of its likely service conditions.

Not significantly useful at sea, it was used experimentally on land during the EOKA armed struggle in Cyprus during the late 1950s. Never an important piece of equipment in ASW terms, Yellow Duckling did give rise to the very important field of infrared linescan surveillance, which was an important military reconnaissance technique throughout the 1960s and 1970s.

== Clinker ==
Interest in wake detection re-emerged in the early 1960s, to counter the problem of nuclear submarines. Yellow Duckling was developed further as Clinker. The distinction between the two systems is unclear, but Clinker appears, by name, in 1962 studies.

Either Clinker, or Yellow Duckling, was required as a submarine wake detection system for part of OR.350, the Operational Requirement issued for a new maritime patrol aircraft to enter service by 1968. It was included, mounted in wing nacelles, as part of both the BAC One-Eleven and Vickers Vanguard-based responses to OR.381 of 1964, the Interim Maritime Patrol aircraft.

== See also ==
- List of Rainbow Codes
