= Blue Bunny =

Blue Bunny may refer to:

- Blue Bunny, ice cream produced by Wells Dairy in Iowa, US
- Blue Bunny, ten-kiloton nuclear mine, later renamed Blue Peacock, using the Blue Danube physics package.
- Blue Bunny, flight suit ("Suit, Flyers, Electrically Heated, Type F-1")
