= Orange Poodle =

- Country of origin: UK
- Manufacturer: Marconi
- Introduced: 1952
- No. built: 1
- Type: early warning
- Frequency: 13 m (shortwave)
- PRF: 620 pps
- Pulsewidth: 100 μS
- Range: 90 mi (140 km)
- Power: 1 kW

Orange Poodle was an experimental over-the-horizon radar developed in the United Kingdom beginning in 1949 and tested experimentally in 1952 and 53. It used ground waves to follow the curvature of the Earth and allow aircraft to be detected over the sea at very low levels. It was designed to detect a 2 square metres (22 sq ft) target flying at an altitude of 1,000 feet (300 m) at a range of 90 miles (140 km), well below the radar horizon. Testing was highly successful, but it was abruptly cancelled in 1953 when it was pointed out it could be easily jammed by a low-cost shortwave transmitter even from long range.

== History ==
In 1948, Claude Shannon used his recently introduced science of information theory to study radar systems and suggest that there were calculable fundamental limits to their performance. This was unexpected, and provoked wide interest in the radar field.

In 1949, the Telecommunications Research Establishment (TRE), the Air Ministry's radar research arm, began applying this new concept to consider the extraction of both location and velocity information from a radar signal, and to the expected performance of long-range radars against low flying aircraft and the detection of submarine snorkels in rough seas.

The work was interesting enough that the Ministry of Supply funded further development under the rainbow code "Orange Poodle". The system operated in the shortwave region, at 13 m wavelength. The signal was sent in-phase into a series of vertical antenna elements, and on reception, it was separated through its Doppler shift into bands of ⅓ Hz.

For experimental purposes, Marconi built a smaller version with eight elements that was constructed by connecting them to one of the disused Chain Home antennas at RAF Downderry in Cornwall. This mounting meant it could point only in one direction. Experiments began in September 1952, and found reasonable results in spite of interference from local shortwave sources.

A larger version consisting of 32 elements strung between two towers was completed in January 1953, and underwent testing in February and March. Sea clutter was completely absorbed in the lower frequency receivers, and aircraft were easily detected in the higher frequencies, corresponding to faster movement. Signal strength turned out to be even better than expected because scattering off the troposphere added to the signal.

The tests were very encouraging and led to plans for a production version that might be part of the ROTOR network. However, by the end of the year development had been cancelled when it was pointed out how easily the system was interfered with by local shortwave sources; an enemy could easily jam the radar using low-cost commercial transmitters while still well below the horizon.

== See also ==
- Blue Joker, another radar system developed to solve the same problem
