= Black Maria (IFF) =

1950s British-made IFF interrogator for interceptors

Black Maria was the rainbow code name for an identification friend or foe (IFF) interrogator carried by interceptor aircraft in the Royal Air Force and US Navy. When initially developed, beginning in 1951, it was based on the World War II-era IFF Mark III IFF system because the newer IFF Mark X units were not available from US at the time. Marconi received interim Mark X equipment in mid-1953 and quickly added support, but it was not until mid-1955 that the first production units became available. During development in the UK, it was also referred to as the Fighter Identity System, or FIS. In the US it was known as TN-103/APX.
