= Rainbow Code =

British military research project code names

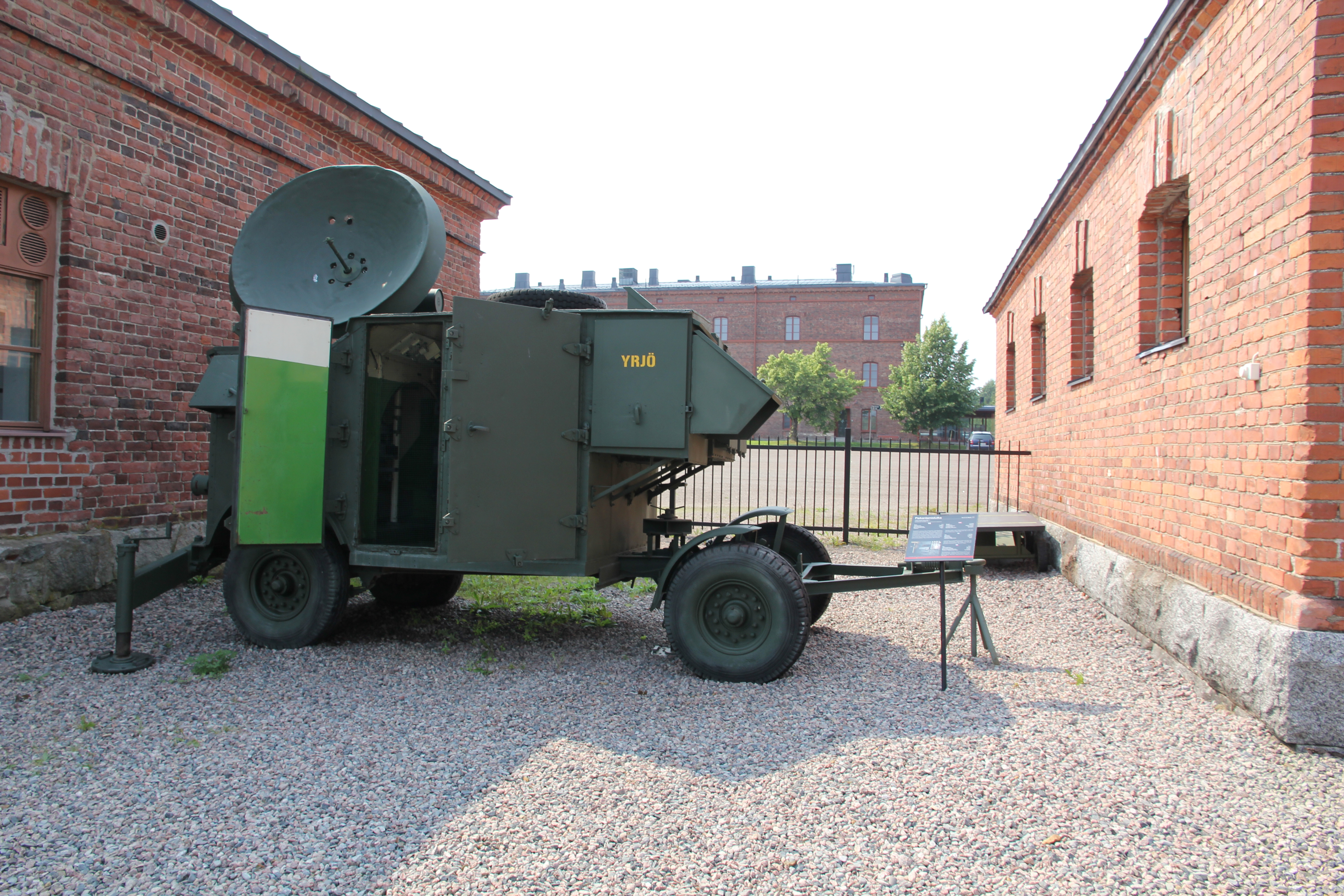
AA No. 3 Mk. 7 mobile anti-aircraft radar, nicknamed "Blue Cedar."

The Rainbow Codes were a series of code names used to disguise the nature of various British military research projects. They were mainly used by the Ministry of Supply from the end of the Second World War until 1958, when the ministry was broken up and its functions distributed among the forces. The codes were replaced by an alphanumeric code system, consisting of two letters followed by three digits.

== History ==
During World War II, British intelligence was able to glean details of new German technologies simply by considering their code names. For instance, when they heard of a new radio navigation system known as Wotan, Reginald Victor Jones asked around and found that Wotan was a one-eyed god. Based on this, he guessed that – unlike its predecessors – the Wotan system used a single radio beam. This proved correct, and although it was later discovered that the codename's descriptiveness was actually simple co-incidence, the Royal Air Force were nevertheless able to develop a technique for jamming Wotan so comprehensively that the system became entirely useless to the Germans.

Wishing to avoid making this sort of mistake, the Ministry of Supply (MoS) initiated a system that would be entirely random and deliberately unrelated to the program in any way, while still being easy to remember. Each rainbow code name was constructed from a randomly selected colour, plus a noun taken from a list, for example:

- "Blue" + "Steel" = Blue Steel, a nuclear-armed stand-off missile
- "Green" + "Mace" = Green Mace, an anti-aircraft (AA) gun.

While most colour and noun combinations were meaningless, some combinations produced real names, although quite unrelated to the project they designated. For example, "Black Maria" is also a nickname for a police van and the "Red Duster" is a nickname for the Red Ensign, the flag flown by British merchant ships. Some code names were not assigned through the official system, but created to sound like it. The Blue Yeoman radar is an example, an unofficial name created by combining the names of two other projects, Blue Riband and Orange Yeoman.

The names were mostly dropped with the end of the Ministry in 1959. Its functions were split between the War Office, the Air Ministry, and the newly created Ministry of Aviation, which was responsible for civil aviation. After the reorganization, projects were mostly named with randomly selected codes comprising two letters and three digits, e.g. BL755, WE.177. Rainbow codes, or at least names that look like them without being official, have occasionally been used for some modern systems; current examples include the Orange Reaper electronic support measures system and the Blue Vixen radar—the latter most likely so named because it was a replacement for the Blue Fox radar.

== Projects ==
=== Black ===
- Black Arrow – satellite launch vehicle derived from Blue Streak/Black Knight
- Black Knight – launch vehicle used to test re-entry vehicles for Blue Streak
- Black Maria – fighter IFF interrogator
- Black Prince – proposed satellite launch vehicle based on Blue Streak/Black Knight – a.k.a. Blue Star
- Black Rock – surface-to-surface guided missile

=== Blue ===
- Blue Anchor – X-band CW target illumination radar for Bristol Bloodhound – a.k.a. AMES Type 86
- Blue Badger – truck-mounted nuclear land mine – later renamed Violet Mist
- Blue Bishop – portable 2.5 MW nuclear-powered electrical generator – previously Green Janet
- Blue Boar – TV-guided bomb
- Blue Boy – VHF speech scrambling
- Blue Bunny – ten-kiloton nuclear mine; see Blue Peacock
- Blue Cat – nuclear warhead, a.k.a. Tony – UK version of US W44, a.k.a. Tsetse
- Blue Cedar – AA No. 3 Mk. 7 mobile anti-aircraft radar
- Blue Danube – the first British nuclear weapon in service
- Blue Devil – T4 optical bombsight – drift and ground speed from Green Satin
- Blue Diamond – AA No. 7 anti-aircraft radar
- Blue Diver – ARI (Airborne Radio Installation) 18075 airborne low-band VHF jammer – against metric frequency radar such as Tall King – fitted to Victor and Vulcan
- Blue Dolphin – Blue Jay Mk V for Sea Vixen – see Hawker Siddeley Red Top
- Blue Duck – anti-submarine warfare missile, entered service as Ikara
- Blue Envoy – surface-to-air missile to OR.1140, replaced Green Sparker as "Stage 2" SAM
- Blue Fox – kiloton-range nuclear weapon, later renamed Indigo Hammer – not to be confused with the later Blue Fox radar
- Blue Fox – airborne radar
- Blue Jacket – ARI (Airborne Radio Installation) 5880 airborne Doppler navigation radar fitted to Hawker-Siddeley Buccaneer aircraft
- Blue Jay – air-to-air missile – entered service as de Havilland Firestreak
- Blue Joker – balloon-borne early warning radar – possibly also known as AMES Type 87
- Blue Kestrel – search radar
- Blue Label – AMES Type 84 radar
- Blue Lagoon – infra-red air-to-air detector
- Blue Mercury – Centurion Crocodile flamethrower tank
- Blue Moon – nuclear-armed cruise missile project, replaced by Blue Streak
- Blue Oak – AWRE Atlas 2 super-computer used for simulation of nuclear explosions
- Blue Orchid – Marconi doppler navigation equipment for helicopters
- Blue Parrot – ARI 5930 I band automatic contour-following radar for Buccaneer – also known as AIRPASS II (acronym for Airborne Interception Radar & Pilot's Attack Sight System)
- Blue Peacock – ten-kiloton nuclear land mine – also known as Blue Bunny and Brown Bunny; it used the Blue Danube physics package
- Blue Perseus – flamethrower kit for the Centurion Crocodile tank
- Blue Ranger – delivery of Blue Steel to Australia
- Blue Rapier – Red Rapier – missiles – see UB.109T
- Blue Riband – large jamming-resistant radar. Cancelled 1958 and replaced by a smaller version as Blue Yeoman
- Blue Rosette – short-case nuclear weapon bomb casing for reconnaissance bomber to spec R156T, including the Avro 730, Handley Page HP.100, English Electric P10, Vickers SP4 and others
- Blue Saga – ARI 18105 airborne radar warning receiver (RWR) – fitted to Victor and Vulcan
- Blue Sapphire – astro-navigation system – see also Orange Tartan
- Blue Shadow – navigation equipment for Canberra B.16, developed as Yellow Aster
- Blue Shield – see Armstrong Whitworth Sea Slug
- Blue Silk – airborne Doppler navigation radar unit with lower speed range than Green Satin
- Blue Sky – see Fairey Fireflash
- Blue Slug – heavy ship-to-ship missile using Sea Slug launcher, nuclear or conventional
- Blue Star – satellite launcher – see Black Prince
- Blue Steel – an air-launched rocket propelled nuclear stand-off missile
- Blue Stone – Unit 386D ENI (Electronic Neutron Initiator) – nuclear weapon component
- Blue Streak – a medium-range ballistic missile
- Blue Study – automatic blind bombing system for V-bombers
- Blue Sugar – air-droppable target marking radio beacon developed by TRE
- Blue Vesta – later version of the Blue Jay air-to-air missile
- Blue Vixen – pulse-Doppler radar for Sea Harrier FA2
- Blue Warrior (EW) VHF/UHF Jammer – countermeasure to use of radar AA shells
- Blue Water – nuclear-armed tactical surface-to-surface missile intended for Royal Artillery in West Germany; also see Red Rose
- Blue Yeoman – early warning radar, also known as AMES Type 85, a component Linesman; name created from the "Blue" of Blue Riband and the Yeoman of Orange Yeoman. Potentially non-official name.

=== Brown ===
- Brown Bunny – original, unofficial name for Blue Peacock

=== Green ===
- Green Apple – related to Window for measuring drift at sea
- Green Archer – mortar-locating radar
- Green Bacon – experimental anti-aircraft radar for Bofors units
- Green Bamboo – "hybrid" nuclear weapon design similar to Soviet RDS-6s
- Green Bottle – 1944 device for homing on U-boat radio signals (ARI.5574)
- Green Cheese – nuclear anti-ship missile
- Green Flash – Green Cheese's replacement
- Green Flax – surface-to-air guided weapon (SAGW) or surface-to-air missile (SAM); see Yellow Temple
- Green Garland – infrared proximity fuze for Red Top
- Green Garlic – early warning radar, also known as the AMES Type 80
- Green Ginger – surveillance radars – combined installation of AMES Type 88 and AMES Type 89
- Green Granite – thermonuclear warheads: Green Granite (small) and Green Granite (large), both tested at Operation Grapple
- Green Grass – nuclear warhead for Violet Club and Yellow Sun Mark 1 bombs
- Green Hammock – low-altitude bomber, Doppler navigation
- Green Janet – portable, nuclear power plant; see Blue Bishop
- Green Light – SAGW or SAM – see Short Sea Cat
- Green Lizard – tube-launched SAM with variable geometry wings
- Green Mace – 5-inch rapid firing anti-aircraft gun
- Green Minnow – radiometer imager
- Green Palm – ARI 18074 airborne VHF voice channel jammer with four pre-set channels, replaced in the Vulcan B2 by the I band jammer
- Green Salad – ARI 18044 wide-band VHF Homing equipment for the Avro Shackleton
- Green Satin – ARI 5851 airborne Doppler navigation radar unit
- Green Sparkler – advanced SAM for the "Stage 2" program, became Blue Envoy
- Green Thistle – infra-red homing system based on the German wartime Kielgerät
- Green Walnut – blind bombing equipment
- Green Water – pilotless interceptor/SAGW
- Green Willow – EKCO AI Mk. 20 Fire Control radar, backup to ARI 5897 AI Mk. 23 Airborne Interception radar for the English Electric P.1 fighter
- Green Wizard – instrument for calibrating anti-aircraft guns by measuring their muzzle velocity

=== Indigo ===
- Indigo Bracket – S-band radar jamming system
- Indigo Corkscrew – continuous wave radar, used with the Bristol Bloodhound and English Electric Thunderbird SAMs
- Indigo Hammer, formerly Blue Fox – nuclear weapon

=== Jade ===
- Jade River – continuous wave radar, developed from Indigo Corkscrew

=== Orange ===
- Orange Blossom – probably a deliberate mis-identification of the Orange Crop pods fitted to 1312 Flight Hercules aircraft, possibly pod-mounted electronic support measures used on the Hercules
- Orange Cocktail – experimental homing radar weapon from the 1950s
- Orange Crop – Racal MIR 2 ESM system for Royal Navy Lynx and Royal Navy Sea King helicopters (HAS.5 onwards but not Mk 4 "Junglies", who had the Racal Prophet lightweight RWR fitted to some, or to the Royal Navy SAR) and some Royal Air Force Hercules aircraft
- Orange Harvest – S and X band warning receiver fitted to Shackletons
- Orange Herald – large boosted fission nuclear warhead, tested at Operation Grapple in 1957
- Orange Nell – short-range surface-to-air missile (SAGW)
- Orange Pippin – Ferranti, anti-aircraft, fire-control radar
- Orange Poodle – low altitude, OTHR (Over-the-Horizon) early-warning radar – abandoned
- Orange Putter – ARI 5800 airborne passive radar warning receiver tuned to Soviet AI radars and fitted to Canberra and Valiant
- Orange Reaper – Racal "Kestrel" ESM system for Royal Navy Merlin helicopters
- Orange Tartan – 'Auto-Astro' automated star navigation system (day) – see also Blue Sapphire (night)
- Orange Toffee – radar for Blue Envoy
- Orange William – heavy anti-tank missile, canceled, later replaced by Swingfire
- Orange Yeoman – early warning radar and guidance for Bristol Bloodhound SAGW – a.k.a. AMES Type 82

=== Pink ===
- Pink Hawk – early name for Fairey Fireflash missile. As this was a "watered down" version of the Red Hawk, and thus pink, it is an example of Rainbow Codes having some implied meaning, rather than their usual purely deliberately meaningless choice.

=== Purple ===
- Purple Granite – nuclear weapon – see Green Granite
- Purple Passion – sub-kiloton demolition mine project related to Violet Mist
- Purple Possum – VX nerve agent

=== Red ===
- Red Achilles – flamethrower kit for the CT 25 armoured carrier
- Red Angel – air-launched anti-ship weapon or "special bomb"
- Red Bacchus – mobile mixing plant for Red Vulcan flamethrower fuel
- Red Beard – nuclear weapon
- Red Biddy – infantry platoon anti-tank missile, cancelled 1953
- Red Brick – experimental continuous-wave target illuminating radar
- Red Cabbage – naval radar
- Red Carpet – X-band radar jammer
- Red Cat – air-launched nuclear stand-off missile cancelled 11/54.
- Red Cheeks – inertially guided bomb based on the work of Tubby Vielle
- Red Cyclops – flamethrower kit for the FV201 tank
- Red Dean – large air-to-air missile
- Red Devil – experimental blind bombing system using Green Satin and Red Setter radars together
- Red Drover – airborne radar – see Avro 730
- Red Duster – Bristol Bloodhound surface-to-air missile
- Red Elsie – AP No. 8 anti-personnel mine, developed jointly with Canada.
- Red Eye (Redeye) – An American general-purpose infra-red homing missile
- Red Flag – free-fall nuclear bomb – 'Improved Kiloton Bomb' – WE.177
- Red Flannel – experimental Q band H2S
- Red Garter – Cossor ARI 5818 airborne tail warning radar for the Vulcan, did not enter service
- Red Hawk – large air-to-air missile "downrated" to give Pink Hawk which became Blue Sky
- Red Heathen – early SAM project, became Red Shoes and Red Duster
- Red Hebe – air-to-air missile, a replacement for Red Dean
- Red Hermes – FV3702 armoured fuel trailer for flamethrower tanks
- Red Indian – analogue anti-aircraft fire control computer for Bofors L/70 gun.
- Red King – two-barrel revolver cannon, developed alongside Red Queen. The name is likely not random, but instead a reference to its Oerlikon factory designation, RK, for Revolver Kanone.
- Red Light – X band jammer for V Bombers, entered service as ARI 18146
- Red Neck – airborne side-looking radar (SLAR), tested on the Victor, a 40 foot long aerial under each wing. Flexing in flight corrupted the resolution. Cancelled 1962.
- Red Planet – infantry platoon anti-tank missile
- Red Queen – rapid fire 42 mm revolver cannon anti-aircraft gun
- Red Rapier, Blue Rapier missiles – see UB.109T
- Red Rose – short-range, battlefield nuclear missile for the British Army – English Electric – later known as Blue Water; cancelled 1962
- Red Sea (AA) – the AA predictor designed for use with the Green Mace automatic AA gun
- Red Setter – experimental side-looking radar for V bombers
- Red Shoes – see English Electric Thunderbird
- Red Shrimp – ARI 18076 airborne high-band jammer fitted to Victor and Vulcan
- Red Snow – nuclear weapon physics package – fitted to Yellow Sun Mk2 and Blue Steel
- Red Steer – EKCO ARI 5919/ARI 5952 airborne tail warning radar – development of AI 20 Green Willow – fitted to Victor and Vulcan. The name likely refers to Jerry Steer at the RRE
- Red Ticket – associated with AI 17 radar
- Red Top – air-to-air missile developed from the Firestreak Mk 4
- Red Tulip – phase coherent radar Moving Target Indicator (MTI)
- Red Vulcan – flamethrower fuel mixture

=== Violet ===
- Violet Banner – infrared seeker for Red Top
- Violet Club – nuclear weapon
- Violet Friend – simple ABM system ordered under AST.1135
- Violet Mist – truck-mounted nuclear land mine – formerly Blue Badger. Used the Red Beard physics package
- Violet Picture – UHF Homer, built by Plessey – Fitted to many RAF aircraft
- Violet Vision – nuclear warhead for Corporal missile – based on Red Beard

=== Yellow ===
- Yellow Anvil – nuclear artillery shell warhead
- Yellow Aster – H2S Mk 9A bombing radar, fitted to V bombers
- Yellow Barley – radar warning receiver
- Yellow Duckling – infra-red submarine detector
- Yellow Feather – missile seeker
- Yellow Fever – fire control system for the Bofors L/70 anti-aircraft gun, comprising a Blue Diamond radar and a Red Indian analogue computer
- Yellow Gate – Loral ESM for E-3D Sentry and Nimrod MR.2
- Yellow Jack – Orange Pippin's radar component
- Yellow Lemon – Doppler-navigation system for naval aircraft. Valve-based precursor to the transistorised Blue Jacket.
- Yellow River – mobile tactical control radar for Bristol Bloodhound – a.k.a. AMES Type 83
- Yellow Sand – anti-ship missile, possibly a precursor to Green Cheese
- Yellow Sun – nuclear weapon casing
- Yellow Temple – nuclear-armed SAGW development of Red Shoes
- Yellow Tiger – Target illuminating radar used with the Thunderbird missile
- Yellow Veil – ALQ-167 pod for Royal Navy Lynx

== Non-Rainbow codes ==
Several British military-related terms have a similar "colour" format to Rainbow Codes, but are not true examples since they do not refer to classified research projects and/or were adopted long after Rainbow Codes went out of use. Others are entirely unofficial (sometimes humorous) nicknames. These include:

- Black Banana – unofficial nickname for the Blackburn Buccaneer. The name "ARNA" (allegedly an acronym for "A Royal Navy Aircraft") was submitted to a Blackburn in-house naming competition. It was only when "Blackburn ARNA" was said out loud that the joke became clear. The initial service aircraft were painted Anti-flash white and were thus nicknamed "Peeled Nanas".
- Black Beacon – The Orfordness Rotating Wireless Beacon, known simply as the Orfordness Beacon or sometimes the Black Beacon, was an early radio navigation system
- Blue Circle – sardonic name for concrete ballast for Buccaneer while awaiting Blue Parrot radar. Also used for Sea Harrier ballast in place of Blue Fox radar, and Tornado F.2 ballast. From the Blue Circle cement company.
- Blue Eric – improvised I band ECM jammer against the Fledermaus anti-aircraft gun control radar used by Argentine forces during the Falklands War. Installed in the Harrier GR.3's starboard 30mm gun pod.
- Blue Yeoman – unofficial name for an experimental radar made from components of the Blue Riband and Orange Yeoman
- Green Goddess – colloquial name for Civil Defence fire pump
- Green Meat – a 'spoof' SAM programme reported in the 1976 RAF Yearbook
- Green Parrot – unconfirmed low yield nuclear weapon mentioned in a 1981 New Statesman article by Duncan Campbell who later claimed that it was "probably" a copy of the US B57 nuclear bomb. The WE.177 has incorrectly been referred to as the Green Parrot by some authors. However Green Parrot was a NATO codename for the Soviet PFM-1 anti-infantry mine. Green Parrot was also the term for an admiral's barge, traditionally with a green-painted hull.
- Green Porridge – RAF aircrew nickname for green-tinted H2S bombing radar display PPI image in Valiant, Victor & Vulcan
- Red Arrows – RAF display team
- Red Devils – Parachute Regiment display team
- Red Slab – joke name for a large ballast weight replacing the nose radar in Avro Vulcan XH558 in its return to flight as a civil display aircraft.
- Violet Fire – Ultraviolet light fire detection system for Concorde engine bays.

== In popular culture ==
An allusion to the Rainbow codes was made in the title of the 1961 Alistair MacLean Cold War novel The Dark Crusader, even more so in the American edition's title The Black Shrike. Both names were based on Blue Streak (which was mentioned in the novel); the title was of a fictional solid-fueled ICBM which was the object of a covert theft operation at an isolated Fijian test site.

== See also ==
- British military aircraft designation systems
- Nuclear weapons and the United Kingdom
- Rainbow Herbicides
