= Red Queen (anti-aircraft gun) =

1950s British anti-aircraft gun prototypes

Red King and Red Queen were experimental revolver cannon anti-aircraft guns developed for the British Army during the 1950s. Red King was a two-barrel design from Oerlikon, Red Queen was a single-barrel water-cooled design. The project was cancelled with the introduction of the Bofors 40 mm/L70, which became the standard anti-aircraft gun for the Army until it was replaced by the Rapier missile in the 1970s.

== History ==
=== Red King ===
In the late 1940s the British Army began the process of replacing their Bofors 40 mm L/60 gun guns. The introduction of higher-performance aircraft, especially jet-powered fighter-bombers and light bombers, proved to fly so fast that they exited the effective range of the Bofors before it could get enough rounds out to have a reasonable possibility of hitting the target. A gun with higher ballistic performance would increase the range, and thus reaction time, and a much higher firing rate was also desirable.

Oerlikon heard of the concept and proposed an entirely new revolver cannon using a 42 mm (1.7 in) calibre round fired from a twin-barrel gun operated by a single seven-chamber revolving block. The Army was interested and offered a development contract in 1950. Oerlikon assigned the project the name "421 RK", for "42mm, model 1, Revolver Kanon", which was given the Ministry of Supply Rainbow Code "Red King". (Note: Although rainbow codes were supposed to be selected randomly, there are many instances where this was not the case. Williams speculates that was the case here, and that "Red King" was selected based on Oerlikon's "RK" name.)

=== Red Queen ===
For reasons that are not recorded in available materials, in 1952 the Army decided to design their own AA gun of similar performance. This was assigned the name "Red Queen". They kept the same 42 mm (1.7 in) shell but introduced a shorter and wider cartridge case, possibly to ease operation of the chamber. In contrast to Red King, a single water-cooled barrel was used. A large disk-shaped magazine on the left side of the barrel, as seen from behind, carried the rounds.

=== Cancellation ===
Both projects appear to have had low priority and little documentation on either appears after 1957. 421RK continued to at least 1958, while Red Queen appears to have been abandoned before then due to development problems. The last mention of either project is in a 1960 memo about leftover test rounds for the Red King.

== See also ==
- Green Mace, a heavy counterpart to these light guns.
