= UB.109T =

British cold war cruise missile project

- Type: radio guided cruise missile
- Place of origin: United Kingdom

Production history
- Designed: 1950
- Manufacturer: Vickers-Armstrong (Aircraft) Ltd

Specifications
- Warhead: various up to 5,000 pounds (2,300 kg)
- Operational range: 400 nautical miles (740 km; 460 mi)
- Flight ceiling: 50,000 ft
- Maximum speed: 600 mph (970 km/h)
- Guidance system: radio
- Steering system: control surfaces
- Launch platform: launching ramp

UB.109T, better known as Red Rapier, was a British cruise missile project calling for a system able to deliver a 5,000 lb (2.27 tonne) conventional warhead within 100 yards (Note: Later relaxed to 250 yards.) of its target at over 400 nautical miles (740 km; 460 mi) range while travelling at 600 mph (970 km/h) at 50,000 ft (15,000 m).

The concept dates to an October 1950 study for a Short Range Expendable Bomber, essentially an updated V-1 flying bomb. At the time, the Royal Air Force (RAF) bomber fleet was propeller driven and not expected to be able to survive encounters with Soviet jet fighters. Looking for a way to make pinpoint tactical attacks, the Telecommunications Research Establishment (TRE) developed a new radio navigation system that provided the required accuracy. To reach the desired range, the V-1's pulsejet was replaced with small turbojets. Proposals from Bristol and Vickers appeared interesting and received development contracts under the rainbow code names "Blue Rapier" and "Red Rapier" respectively.

That year, intelligence reports suggested the Soviets were contemplating an attack on NATO around 1953. On returning to power in 1951, Winston Churchill gave the project "super priority", and Red Rapier was selected to move forward. Air launches from B-29 Washington bombers over Woomera began in 1954. By this time the threat of imminent Soviet attack had passed and the RAF's new jet bombers were entering service. These had the performance to carry out the daytime precision role. The project was cancelled on 30 September 1954. Several of the testing systems developed for the program were shared with Vickers Blue Boar project, which was cancelled around the same time.

After the project ended, there was some interest in using the Blue Rapier design as a decoy missile to aid the V bomber force penetrate Soviet defences, but this was abandoned in favour of improved electronic countermeasures.

== History ==
=== RAF concerns ===
The first specifications for jet powered strategic bombers for the Royal Air Force (RAF) emerged in 1946 and several proposals were selected for development. By 1949 these were still years off, and the RAF's primary heavy bomber was the Avro Lincoln, an updated version of the mid-war Avro Lancaster. As these lacked the range to easily attack Russia, an order for 88 B-29 Superfortresses was placed and entered RAF service as the "Washington". This was strictly a stopgap move while they awaited the arrival of the jets.

In 1947, the Soviet Union publicly introduced the Tu-4 Bull, a reverse engineered version of the B-29. In 1948, the RAF carried out a series of tests against the Washingtons to develop interception tactics against the Tu-4. The Gloster Meteor and de Havilland Vampire fighters proved to be able to attack the bombers with relative ease. It was already well known that the Soviets were introducing jet fighters of their own, which suggested the RAF's bombers would soon be at equal risk. While the new jet powered bombers would address this problem, they were still not expected to be available in numbers until the mid-1950s.

In late 1950, there was growing alarm that the Soviets would attempt some sort of attack on NATO in the next three years. If this occurred during the critical period before the switch to jet power, the RAF would have limited ability to counter the Soviet forces by air. Whilst the strategic mission could still be carried out at night with relative impunity, (Note: Large military exercises like Exercise Ardent demonstrated that night attack was almost completely safe even for the Lincolns.) the long-range daytime tactical role appeared extremely dangerous. Tests in 1952 concluded that it would be "extremely difficult for Bomber Command to devise any tactics which would reduce these losses within acceptable limits."

=== SREB, UB.109T ===
The Air Ministry felt the only possible solution that might be available in a short time was an unmanned expendable bomber, an updated V-1 flying bomb. The V-1 was a low-accuracy weapon designed to attack cities. To replace bombers in the day role, where attacks would be against point targets like bridges and railway yards, accuracy would have to be greatly improved. The concept was known as the "Short Range Expendable Bomber", or SREB.

The initial call for proposals was sent in October 1950 under the name UB.109T, for "unmanned bomb". It was initially sent to Avro, Bristol Aeroplane, de Havilland and Vickers-Armstrong Ltd. Later, Fairey, Gloster and Saunders-Roe were added, along with an unsolicited entry by Boulton Paul. Of these, the Bristol and Vickers entries seemed interesting enough to send out operational requirement OR.1097 on 17 December 1950.

Bristol's entry, the Type 182, was based on the swept wing planform from the Folland Gnat, with a plastic (Note: Likely glass reinforced plastic but sources are not specific.) fuselage and a V-tail. It would be powered by a new Bristol Siddeley engine, the BE.17 of about 3,000 pounds-force (13,000 N). This entry was assigned the rainbow code "Blue Rapier".

Vickers entry, returned on 18 January 1951, was much more like the original V-1 with straight wings and a conventional three-part tail control section. It would be powered by three Rolls-Royce Soar engines of 1,750 pounds-force (7,800 N), one each at the tip of the three tail control surfaces. This was assigned the code name "Red Rapier".

For the guidance system, the Telecommunications Research Establishment (TRE) proposed an updated version of the war-era Oboe blind-bombing system in which two ground-based radar-like systems would simultaneously take distance measurements to determine the location of the missile in flight, calculate any needed corrections, and then send them to the missile's autopilot. They originally called the system "feed back Oboe", but later named it "TRAMP". (Note: TRAMP is always capitalized, which implies it is an acronym. None of the available resources mentions what it stands for.)

=== Development ===
On Winston Churchill's return to power after the October 1951 general election, he was apprised of the issues that led to SREB. He ordered the project be given "super priority". After a number of detail changes, Vickers learned they were going to be declared the winner of the contract. This would be the company's first entry into the guided weapon market. They proposed to build a dozen 1/3-scale versions as the Vickers Type 719 for air-launch tests from the Washingtons to test flight and guidance. The full-scale version would be known as the Type 725.

As the missile airframe was entirely conventional, the company was able to begin development using their own funding while Rolls-Royce did the same for the Soar engines. The guidance system was entirely new, and the company would not be able to afford to develop it on its own. At a meeting with Robert Cockburn of the Ministry of Supply (MoS) in July 1952, it was agreed to begin the development of the missile while the MoS would supply funding for the development of the guidance systems. This led to the formation of a new Guided Weapons Department at Vickers Weybridge. The funding was slow in coming, with an actual agreement not reached until August 1953, and the final contract for £450,000 on 30 October 1953.

=== Testing ===
While they waited for funding of the guidance system, Vickers began airframe development and drop tests of the sub-scale 719's. Development of the new Range AI at Woomera was underway for another Vickers project, Blue Boar, and was largely complete by 1952. This smaller range was suitable for testing the 719, while the full-scale 725 would move to a newly developed 400 kilometres (250 mi) Range E starting in 1955.

For the 719 tests, the airframes were slung under the rear bomb bay of the Washington on a trapeze system that required the removal of the bomb bay doors. The entire flight was carried out under radio control, and extensive telemetry sent back to the ground.

To recover the system, a radio command caused three parachutes to deploy and then separate the nose section. The nose had a metal spike that dug into the ground, leaving the fuselage standing vertically above the ground so it could be easily seen by recovery crews. The system was successful to the point that some 719's survived up to five test flights, and the spike concept was then used to test Blue Boar as well.

In one case the recovery command was sent in error, causing the parachutes to deploy on the still-attached portion while the nose section separated and nearly hit a nearby P-51 Mustang operating cameras. The parachutes caused the B-29 pilot to be thrown forward into his seat belts, and then wrapped around the tail section of the aircraft, but the aircraft was able to land without problem.

=== Cancellation ===
Delayed by up to two years by the slow funding of the guidance system, tests were still being carried out in August 1954 when the whole concept was called into question by the imminent arrival of the Vickers Valiant. The Valiant started as another solution to the late arrival of the jet strategic bombers, with roughly the same performance as the original 1946 contract but carrying a smaller 15,000-pound (6,800 kg) bombload and slightly shorter range. The RAF was much more interested in manned bombers than unmanned and was perfectly happy to cancel the project. Vickers was also not particularly upset to lose the project given they won the bomber contract. Valiant would go on to be a great success.

Work stopped on 30 September 1954, with a formal cancellation in 1955. The final payouts on the guidance development did not occur until September 1957. Blue Boar was cancelled around the same time, leading to the closure of Woomera's Range AI.

=== Decoy missile use ===
Around this same time, lengthy debate on the survivability of the V bomber force in light of Soviet developments of surface-to-air missiles (SAMs) led to some consideration of using the Blue Rapier design as a decoy missile. The idea was to launch several of these missiles during the approach to the target, presenting too many radar targets to allow the ground controlled interception controllers to pick out the bombers. This would be combined with a standoff missile, which emerged as Blue Steel, which would allow the bombers to remain outside of the range of the Soviet SAMs. The concept was dropped in favour of an improved suite of electronic countermeasures, notably systems to jam Soviet voice communications and long-range radars.

== Description ==
=== Missile ===
The Type 725 looked like a slimmer version of the V-1, with the long pulsejet formerly on top of the fuselage replaced by three much smaller Soar engines at the tip of the vertical and horizontal control surfaces at the rear. Electrical power was provided by a ram air turbine with a small inlet on the top of the fuselage. The only other notable difference with the V-1 was the additional of ailerons on the wings, as opposed to the V-1's use of the rudder only. The ailerons were only used during the initial flight while under direct radio command. After starting automatic control, the autopilot made small corrections using the rudder like the V-1.

To lower costs, the entire fuselage and most of the surfaces were constructed of welded mild steel. The fuselage was a steel sheet rolled into a tube and the wing was sheet steel over box spars. The wing interior served as the fuel tank. The leading edges of the tailplane and fin were sharply swept, but the wing was straight and held to the fuselage by bombslips for easy construction in the field. It was 13 m (42 ft 8 in) long with a 10 m (32 ft 10 in) wingspan.

Like the V-1, the Type 725 would have been launched by a steam catapult, but one of greater power. This allowed it to use a much shorter 35-foot (11 m) long ramp, which in turn allowed the system to be mobile. On arriving at the launch site on a long semi-trailer, a gantry was raised above the trailer and the ramp hoisted up into position at a 25 degree angle. On launch, the catapult accelerated the missile at 30 g, reaching 250 feet per second (270 km/h). It could be launched from any area with 180 feet (55 m) of clearance in front of the ramp, by which point the missile would be at 50 feet (15 m) altitude. The piston driving the missile was slowed by a conical spike at the front of the piston that was driven through a membrane into a tank of water at the end of the ramp. The tank was replaced between launches.

After launch, the missile was invisible to the guidance radars which were located some distance away. Initial flight by the autopilot was aided by a flux gate compass in the wing tip to keep it flying on a steady course while continuing to climb to its cruise altitude of 50,000 feet (15,000 m). After flying about half of its mission distance it would become visible to the ground-based radars, which then tracked it continually as it approached the target.

On arrival at the target, the engines were turned off and the missile commanded into a rapid climb that bled away speed. It would then perform a "bunt", pitching over to a vertical dive. Because the autopilot's gyroscopes rotated through a large angle during this period, the entire guidance platform was mounted on a pivot to allow them to remain vertical during this maneuver. The radars continued to track the missile as it fell toward the radar horizon, sending updates throughout. After contact was lost, generally around 20,000 feet (6,100 m) altitude, the autopilot kept it on the last course until impact.

Two payloads were initially specified: a single 5,000-pound (2,300 kg) bomb or five 1,000-pound (450 kg) bombs. An April 1953 meeting added a third with ten 500-pound (230 kg) bombs carrying VT Mk. 9 proximity fuses, and late experiments in November 1954 considered cluster bombs and incendiaries. The warheads were held at the front of the missile and separated prior to impact.

Late in the program there was some consideration given to having the missile perform alternating 1G maneuvers to the left and right as it approached the target in order to make it difficult to hit by air defences. Some consideration was also given to adding armour plating in key areas to make it better able to withstand anti-aircraft artillery, but this added 400 pounds (180 kg).

=== Guidance ===
In order to overwhelm local air defences, the weapon was to be used in a barrage fashion. The specifications demanded a very high salvo rate with 100 missiles in the air at once attacking up to five separate targets. The required accuracy had been met during the war using the Oboe system, but this was an intensely manual affair that could only guide a single aircraft at a time. A somewhat less accurate system, Gee-H, was aircraft mounted but would require considerable electronics to automate that would moot the low-cost requirement. To solve these contradictory problems, the TRE proposed a highly automated version of Oboe that put most of the logic on the ground.

In Oboe, prior to the mission the range to the target was measured from a ground station referred to as "cat". Cat sent out periodic radio pulses, interrogations, to the aircraft whose transponder would respond with a similar pulse. This return pulse was received at cat and displayed on an oscilloscope. The time between sending and receiving measured the range to the aircraft. Normally this would be accomplished using a scale attached to the face of the oscilloscope, but that was not accurate enough for Oboe. Instead, a highly accurate electronic delay was added to offset the aircraft's blip, and the operator would move it back or forth so that it would appear in the middle of the display when it was at the correct pre-selected range.

If the plane drifted off the range, the blip would move left or right on the display, measured against a thin metal wire. The operator would then play a sound into the radio telling the pilot to turn left or right to get back to the correct range. As the aircraft continued flying toward the target, the resulting series of corrections caused it to fly along the circular arc with a radius equal to the range between the cat station and the target. A second station, "mouse", produced a similar range measurement to the target prior to the flight. The intersection of the line from mouse to the target with the arc drawn by cat indicated the drop point. The operator at the mouse station would watch the aircraft fly along the curving path until it approached the target, and then send a signal to the pilot to drop at the right moment.

This intensely manual process was not suitable for the UB.109T concept, the process would have to be highly automated in order to guide mass attacks. It was also not suitable for attacks against more than one target at a time unless there were multiple ground stations, and Oboe stations were not simple affairs. A further complication was that the launches might take place only minutes after the missile arrived at its launch location. Any pre-mission setup had to be simplified as much as possible, and any site-specific measurements could not require information to be sent to the launcher. The TRAMP system solved these problems with two changes to the original Oboe concept.

First, to deal with the problem of handling mass raids, the interrogation signals sent out from the ground station were varied in their pulse repetition frequency (PRF). The transponder on the missile had a delay line system that allowed it to filter out any signal with different PRFs, thereby only responding to a ground station when it sent out that missile's particular PRF. The ground stations cycled through a set of sixty-four PRFs, thereby allowing any one station to control that many missiles. For launch, the missile crew simply selected one of the PRFs of the stations aiming at their target. With several such systems operating against separated targets, hundreds of missiles could be guided at once.

As with Oboe, prior to the mission each guidance station set a delay system that represented the distance from the station to its selected target. Basic operation was the same; the missile was periodically "interrogated" and the time between transmission and response measured the distance between the missile and station. This measured value was then electrically subtracted from the pre-selected delay in the same fashion as Oboe. The result was the "residual range". (Note: The residual range is not the remaining range from the missile to the target, as it is not flying directly along the line from the station to the target.) But in this case there was no operator, the result was an electrical signal representing the time between the send and receive. The station then sent out two new pulses on the same PRF, one immediately after the reception of the missile's signal, and a second after that delay representing the residual range.

A delay line in the missile was triggered by the second pulse and then stored the third, thereby directly storing a measurement of the residual range as a time. This was converted to a voltage using pulse width modulation. The missile would receive and store these measurements from two stations in quick succession. During the early part of the flight, one would typically indicate a longer distance to the target than the other, depending on the launch position relative to the stations. By inverting one of these signals and combining them, the resulting voltage indicated the direction and magnitude of the difference between the two remaining distances.

This result, the "error signal", was then sent into the autopilot, causing the missile to turn towards the signal that had a longer distance to go. Eventually the missile would reach a point where the two error signals were equal. This occurred anywhere along the line running over the target from a point half way along the direct line between the two stations, the "baseline". (Note: The geometry was shaped like a T, with the stations at either end of the horizontal line and the target at the base of the vertical line.) The missile would initially overshoot the line and then be guided in the other direction, but after a short time it would fly a steady path. As the missile approaches the target, both now-equal residual ranges decrease. When they reach zero, the autopilot triggers the terminal phase.

The system was implemented using the existing 200 MHz VHF Rebecca/Eureka transponding radar Mk. 4 units. Since the measurements from the two stations could not be taken at the same time, two delay lines were needed to store the signals for comparison. A February 1954 report considers the use of magnetostriction delays for this role, one of the earliest references to this technology.

The system had two significant problems. One was that the missiles were constantly responding to the ground station interrogations, which presented the possibility of allowing enemy receivers to triangulate the position of the missile even at very long range and prepare the defences. This was offset to some degree by the numbers of such signals that would be expected in an attack, which would overwhelm anyone trying to track a single missile. The signals would still be useful as a warning that an attack was underway. The other was that the enemy could send out spurious pulses on the same frequency and thereby upset the measurements. This was offset somewhat by the PRF filtering on the missiles which would make uncoordinated signals be rejected.

== See also ==
- Rainbow Codes

Aircraft of comparable role, configuration, and era

- MGM-1 Matador – (United States)
