= Radar, Anti-Aircraft No. 4 Mk. 7 =

AA No.4 Mk.7
- Country of origin: UK
- Type: tactical control
- Frequency: S band, 3 GHz
- PRF: 700 to 800
- Beamwidth: 5º horizontal, ~30º vertical
- Pulsewidth: 1.25 μS
- RPM: 15
- Range: 120,000 yd (110,000 m)
- Altitude: 60,000 ft (18,000 m)
- Diameter: 45 ft (14 m)
- Azimuth: 360º
- Precision: 500 yd (460 m) in range, 1.75º azimuth
- Power: 1 MW

Radar, Anti-Aircraft Number 4 Mark 7, or AA No.4 Mk.7 for short, was a mobile medium-range tactical control radar used by the British Army. It was intended to rapidly scan the sky and quickly indicate targets that could then be handed off to anti-aircraft artillery batteries who would then aim their own gun laying radars like the AA No. 3 Mk. 7 using the image provided from the No. 4 on a remote Adjacent Display (AD) unit. The Mk.7/1 added support for IFF Mark X, and the Mk.7/2 was modified for use with surface-to-air missiles.

The system used a unique antenna system designed to be compact and robust. It consisted of a cheese antenna mounted flat on the roof of the operations trailer, and a semi-parabolic reflector in front of it. The cheese produces a signal that is narrow side-to-side, about 5 degrees in this system, but very wide vertically. This signal was then further shaped by the reflector to lessen the vertical angle. The assembly was mounted on a pole that ran through the roof of the trailer and into a bearing on the floor where it was rotated by a motor. For transport, the reflector was folded down on top of the cheese, the assembly moved to center it over the top of the trailer, and then grate-like covers on the sides of the trailer were raised and folded over the top of the antenna system to protect it.

The system was normally operated by a crew of two. Air conditioning was supplied to cool the equipment and the trailer as a whole, with the power and air conditioning systems taking up about half of the trailer and the radar systems the other half. Power was supplied by an external Meadows 27.5 kVA 415/240V three phase 50 Hz generator on a skid that was normally carried in the towing vehicle and then set on the ground during setup. The eight-wheeled trailer massed 10 tons.
