= Gosling solid rocket booster =

Strap on solid rocket booster

The Gosling was a British single nozzle wrap around solid rocket booster developed by Bristol Aircraft Co. in the 1950s to act as a booster motor for the 'Red Duster' Bristol Ferranti Bloodhound for the RAF, the Sea Slug for the Royal Navy, and the Thunderbird for the British Army. All three are surface to air missiles. It would burn for between 8 and 12 seconds, providing an average thrust of 103.24 kN which would allow the Bloodhound missile to reach Mach 2.2 and a maximum altitude of just over 21 km. It was used until 1968 by the RAAF when it was decommissioned. The Gosling also appear on the High Altitude Density (HAD), Cockatoo Mk1 and Mk2 and Aero High sounding rockets which were designed to conduct experiments in the upper atmosphere until 1975. Some of the early HAD experiments involved tracking an inflatable metal sphere through the atmosphere after the HAD and dropped it in the upper atmosphere. Later experiments would study the wind speed and direction among other atmospheric conditions deduced from 'lithium vapour grenades'. One difference is that as a strap on booster for the Bloodhound, the Gosling used a angled nozzle whereas on the HAD it employed a straight nozzle design.

== Development ==
In 1957, the UK Defence Minister Duncan Sandys released a White Paper declaring that manned aircraft were obsolete and development should be focused on unmanned rockets and missiles. The Gosling was born of new Service requirements, which warranted the design of a new wrap around booster for the previously listed missiles. Development on the Bloodhound had already begun in 1953, at the Weapons Research Establishment (WRE) at Woomera in South Australia. The production of the Gosling booster was initiated at the Maribyrnong Explosives Factory in Victoria in the late 1950s.

== Design ==
The Gosling used cordite propellant, which was a family of smokeless propellants designed as a replacement to gunpowder. In the missile, it was extruded in such a way that as burning proceeds parallel to the surface, the area of the burning surface area remains relatively constant. In order to inhibit burning on the exterior surface, a coat of ethyl cellulose was applied, along with two ethyl cellulose washers located at either end. At first, the propellant could only be manufactured in 2 feet lengths due to limitations of the equipment at ROF Bishopton, while the Gosling called for a charge which was around 9 feet long. This was overcome by X-raying each piece before cementing them together to produce a single charge of adequate proportions. In order to ensure a good seal, each 2 foot charge had to be flattened at either end. This was typically done with milling cutters, although a bacon slicer was also used which resulted in a very spectacular fire. The integrity of each of these composite joints would with either a simple bending bar, or a custom rig designed by employee E. C. White which could check all the joints simultaneously. The final charge could then be straightened by heating moulds, or corsets. However, this method often left holes, cracks, or fissures in the propellent which would prematurely expose the casing to hot gases, which could rupture it. This was rectified by the introduction of a larger press at the ROF Bishopton enabled the production of 9 foot extrusions, removing the need to join charges.

=== Sea Slug Design Challenge ===
Shortly after the introduction of the larger press at ROF Bishopton, a problem arose with the Goslings on the Sea Slug. This missile was unique in that the boosters were mounted forward, which the exhaust canted so that the thrust line passed through the centre of pressure. However, this mean that the exhaust had to pass over the missile's control surfaces. This would not have typically caused a problem provided the plume either ignites in secondary burning, or remains dark as with cooler propellants. Unfortunately, solid propellants are fuel rich as it is not possible to produce good physical properties with a stoichiometric ratio where fuel and oxidiser is equally balanced in the correct ratio. In the case of the Gosling booster, the plume tended to produce intermittent flashing typically at the end of burning, resulting in perturbations to the missile when the exhaust passed over the control surfaces. This was circumvented by replacing the last section of the charge with propellant which did not produce the flash. The Sea Slug was the only missile to remain on a composite charge after the new press was introduced.
