= Blue Joker =

British experimental radar

- Country of origin: United Kingdom
- Introduced: 1958
- No. built: 2
- Type: Airborne Early Warning
- Frequency: 3.3 GHz
- PRF: 500 pps
- Beamwidth: 0.8° horizontal, 2.3° vertical
- Pulsewidth: 1.5 S
- RPM: 6 or 8 rpm
- Range: 120 miles
- Azimuth: 360°
- Power: 600 kW peak

Blue Joker, a rainbow code name, was an experimental moored balloon-mounted, airborne early-warning radar project developed by the Royal Radar Establishment (RRE) starting in 1953. The idea was to position the radar high in the air in order to extend its radar horizon and allow it to see low-flying aircraft. Ground reflections were filtered out using a moving target indicator (MTI) system. Two examples were built and tested in the late 1950s, but the project was cancelled in 1960 as part of the Linesman/Mediator efforts.

== Development ==
=== Basic concepts ===
During the early 1950s the Royal Air Force was in the midst of deploying its ROTOR radar network based on the AMES Type 80 (Green Garlic) radars. These were powerful S-band radars able to detect high-flying bombers at ranges as great as 250 miles (400 km). However, due to the curvature of the Earth, they were subject to the local radar horizon so low-flying aircraft were not visible until they approached much more closely. In the early 1950s, there was some concern that Soviet aircraft might be able to fly under the radar's coverage.

Some sort of airborne radar system looking down from above would address this. Aircraft, helicopters and balloons were considered for the role. A system using two barrage balloons developed by the Royal Aircraft Establishment (RAE) at RAF Cardington was eventually selected. This was due to the problem of converting the range and angle information provided by the radar to a location on the ground if the exact location of the platform was not known. This problem didn't exist with balloons, because they were moored to a fixed location.

Microwaves have the advantage that they tend to scatter forward at low angles, so the direct reflection off flat ground does not necessarily return enough signal to the radar to overwhelm it, a problem that had plagued the very high frequency radars of the 1940s. However, it was still subject to reflection off of natural corner reflectors like trees and waves. The solution to this problem is to use a form of moving target indication, or MTI. This filters out slowly-moving returns, leaving only those in a certain speed range to be displayed, in this case, aircraft.

The other problem was getting the signal to the ground; a coaxial cable would lose too much signal and waveguides are not easily made flexible or extendable to account for movement of the balloons. During this period the RRE had begun experimenting with the transmission of radar signals using microwave relays. This system tapped into the changing voltage being sent to the radar display, the video signal, and sent it to the reflector plate of a reflex klystron. This produced a microwave signal with a varying frequency encoding a frequency modulated version of the video. The same idea would be adapted here to send the signal from the balloon to the ground.

=== Blue Joker ===
After discussing the concept in 1953 with several manufacturers, in 1954 a contract was signed with Metropolitan-Vickers to develop the system under the rainbow code "Blue Joker". The radar was a fairly conventional model for the era, using a cavity magnetron as the transmitter source and a reflex klystron as a local oscillator in the superheterodyne receiver.

The radar system was housed in a large spherical radome made of Terylene (Dacron) fabric and made rigid by inflating it to 980 pascals (0.142 psi) with a fan at the base of the sphere. The entire assembly massed 1,660 kilograms (3,660 lb). The system originally used two barrage balloons for lift, but a third was later added. Each balloon provided 1,400 kilograms (3,100 lb) of lift and carried the sphere to an altitude of 1,500 metres (4,900 ft).

The signals from the radar were sent to the ground over a datalink manufactured by EMI. Signals from the ground to the radar were sent by modulating a signal into the power cables. The power cables also served double duty as the mooring cables.

=== Testing ===
The radar and MTI system were tested in 1956 by mounting the new Type 900 antenna on a Radar, Anti-Aircraft No. 4 Mk. 7 system and towing it to a point near the peak of Y Drum in Wales where it could look down on the Irish Sea over Llanfairfechan. This simulated the view from the balloon.

Two prototypes of the complete airborne system built. The first flight was in May 1958, and a total of 29 flights of 50 hours had been completed by 1959. During trials the radar successfully tracked an approaching Canberra jet bomber, 120 miles away (190 km)

Wind proved to be a major problem for the system, limiting the safe flying speed to 70 knots (130 km/h; 81 mph), but only 30 knots (56 km/h; 35 mph) for handling on the ground. The wind also caused the balloons to lose gas at a rapid rate, in one case losing half the gas over a 40-hour period in a gale. Other issues were the life of the tether cable, the vulnerability to lightning strikes, and the system's poor mobility.

=== Cancellation ===
While Blue Joker was being developed, versions of the carcinotron tube were being perfected in the United States. The carcinotron can tune its microwave output over a very wide band, allowing it to match the frequency of any conventional radar system and effectively jam it. It appeared to render single-frequency radars like ROTOR's Type 80 and the Blue Joker effectively useless. Solutions to the problem were quickly developed, but placing them in service would be very expensive.

The 1957 Defence White Paper suggested that by the mid-1960s an air attack by crewed bombers would be unlikely in a battle dominated by ballistic missiles. Through the late 1950s, debate raged about whether to proceed with a new radar network that would not be complete until after this time, when it seemed it would no longer be needed. In early 1960, Harold Macmillan agreed to fund the "Plan Ahead" network under the condition that work on other early warning radar systems ended. Blue Joker was a victim of this decision; it was cancelled in October 1960.

== Description ==
The antenna was a cylindrical design 8.3 by 2.6 metres (27.2 ft × 8.5 ft), with a gain of 42 dB. It was of asbestos-fibre-reinforced phenolic resin with aluminium stripes glued to the front to act as the reflector surface. It was fed by a slotted waveguide in front.

Since the beam was fairly narrow vertically, it had to maintain its level quite accurately to keep it properly aimed at the horizon. This was accomplished by mounting it inside a large gyroscopically leveled gimbal system with the antenna on one side and the electronics on the other to balance it out. Small lead weights were used for finer balancing. The system could maintain level within 0.5° when the mooring cable was tilted as much as 30°.

Running vertically through the middle of the gimbal rings was a 20 centimetres (7.9 in) diameter pole that sat in large bearings at the top and bottom of a 9 metres (30 ft) diameter terylene fabric sphere that was inflated by a fan in the base. The bearings allowed the sphere to turn without moving the radar system, which allowed the balloons to move about in the wind without rotating the antenna. The pole also acted as the connection points on the top and bottom for the guy wires that ran to the ground below and the balloons above. The entire assembly massed 1,660 kilograms (3,660 lb).

The ground wire combined the duties of supplying power to the system as well as mooring the entire system. This consisted of a three-core nylon-insulated power cable. It had a linear density of about 0.9 kilograms (2.0 lb) per meter, which used up half of the total lifting capacity of the system. The original two-balloon system later gave way to a three-balloon system, each providing 1,400 kilograms (3,100 lb) of lift when filled with a total of 2,400 cubic metres (85,000 cu ft) of hydrogen.
