= Blue Peacock =

Proposed British tactical nuclear weapon

Blue Peacock, renamed from Blue Bunny and originally Brown Bunny, was a British tactical nuclear weapon project in the 1950s.

The project's goal was to store a number of ten-kiloton nuclear land mines in Germany. These mines were intended to be placed on the North German Plain and detonated by wire or an eight-day timer in the event of Soviet invasion from the east.

== Design ==
Blue Peacock was designed after the free-falling Blue Danube and weighed 7.2 long tons (7,300 kg). A total of two firing units were built: the casing and the warhead. Due to its large steel casing, it had to be tested outdoors in a flooded gravel pit near Sevenoaks in Kent. Since the bomb would be unattended, anti-tampering devices were also used. The casing was pressurized, and pressure and tilt switches were added. The warhead could be detonated via three methods: a wire located three miles (4.8 km) away, an eight-day timer, or anti-tampering devices. Once armed, Blue Peacock would detonate ten seconds after being moved, if the casing lost pressure, or if it was filled with water.

== Project history ==
The project was developed at the Royal Armament Research and Development Establishment (RARDE) at Fort Halstead in Kent in 1954.

In July 1957 the British Army ordered ten Blue Peacocks for use in Germany, under the cover story that they were atomic power units for troops in the field. In the end, though, the Ministry of Defence cancelled the project in February 1958. It was judged that the risks posed by the nuclear fallout and the political aspects of preparing for destruction and contamination of allied territory were too high to justify.

== Chicken-powered nuclear bomb ==
A technical problem is that during winter, the temperature of buried devices can drop quickly, creating a possibility that the mechanisms of the mine will cease working due to low temperatures in the winter. Various methods were studied to solve this problem, such as wrapping the bombs in insulating blankets.

One proposal suggested that live chickens would be sealed inside the casing, with a supply of food and water. They would remain alive for approximately a week. Their body heat would apparently have been sufficient to keep the mine's components at a working temperature. This proposal was sufficiently outlandish that it was taken as an April Fool's Day joke when the Blue Peacock file was declassified on 1 April 2004. Tom O'Leary, head of education and interpretation at the National Archives, replied to the media that, "It does seem like an April Fool but it most certainly is not. The Civil Service does not do jokes."

== See also ==
- Rainbow Codes – British military research project code names
