= De Havilland Firestreak =

Firestreak
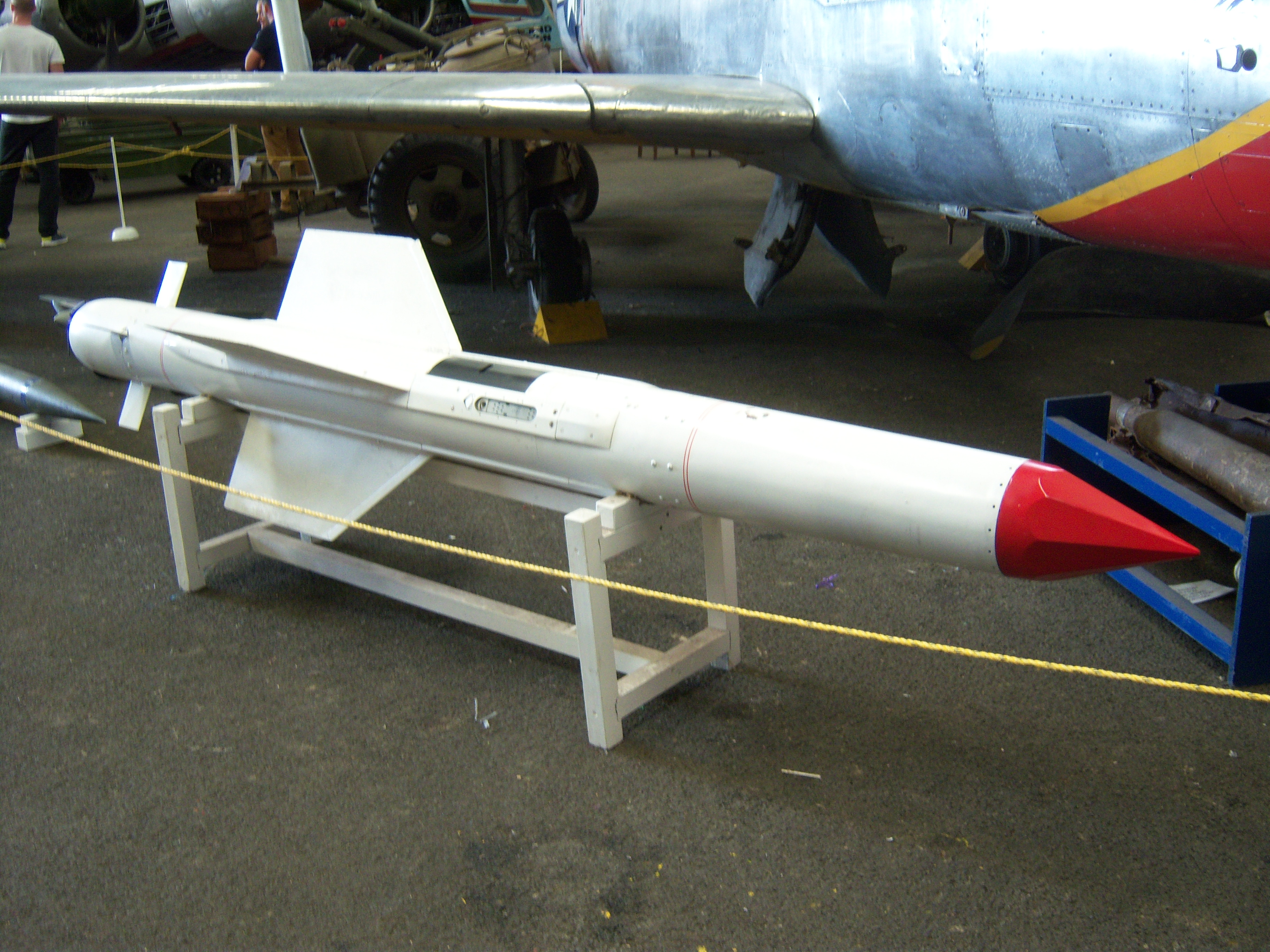
- Type: Air-to-air missile
- Place of origin: United Kingdom

Service history
- In service: 1957–1988
- Used by: United Kingdom, Kuwait, Saudi Arabia

Production history
- Designed: 1951
- Manufacturer: de Havilland Propellers

Specifications
- Mass: 136 kg (300 lb)
- Length: 3.19 metres (10 ft 6 in)
- Diameter: 0.223 m (8.8 in)
- Wingspan: 0.75 m (30 in)
- Warhead: 22.7 kg (50 lb) annular blast fragmentation
- Detonation mechanism: Infrared proximity fuze and secondary continuous wire loop impact fuze
- Engine: Magpie solid fuel motor
- Operational range: 4 miles (6.4 km)
- Maximum speed: Launch speed (1.8 Mach maximum) plus rocket motor increment 1.6 Mach
- Guidance system: Rear-aspect infrared
- Steering system: Control surface
- Launch platform: fixed-wing aircraft

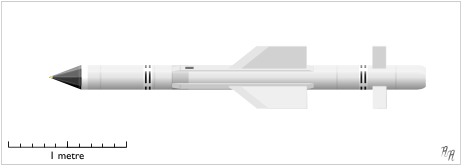

The de Havilland Firestreak is a British first-generation, passive infrared homing (heat seeking) air-to-air missile. It was developed by de Havilland Propellers (later Hawker Siddeley Dynamics) in the early 1950s, entering service in 1957. It was the first such weapon to enter active service with the Royal Air Force (RAF) and Fleet Air Arm, equipping the English Electric Lightning interceptor, de Havilland Sea Vixen naval fighter and the Gloster Javelin all weather interceptor. It was a rear-aspect, fire and forget pursuit weapon, with a field of attack in a rear-facing 20 degree cone.

Developed under the rainbow code "Blue Jay", Firestreak was the third heat-seeking missile to enter service, after the US AIM-4 Falcon and AIM-9 Sidewinder, both of which entered service the previous year. In comparison to those designs, the Firestreak was larger and almost twice as heavy, carrying a much larger warhead. It had otherwise similar performance in terms of speed and range. It was also a very complex system, with an unusual internal design, requiring the launch aircraft to provide both cooling for its valve-based electronics and heating to prevent various moving parts from freezing prior to launch.

An improved version, "Blue Vesta", was developed as part of the Operational Requirement F.155 project but ended when that project was cancelled in 1957. Development restarted as a somewhat simpler version for the Lightning which was given the name "Red Top". This featured transistorized electronics and greatly simplified internal design. Keeping its code name, it entered service on Lightning and Sea Vixen as the Hawker Siddeley Red Top. Red Top could not be carried on early versions of the Lightning, and so Firestreak remained in service until 1988, when the last RAF Lightnings retired.

== Development ==
=== Red Hawk ===
Firestreak was the result of a series of projects begun with the OR.1056 Red Hawk missile, which called for an all-aspect seeker that could attack a target from any launch position. When this proved too ambitious for the state of the art, another specification lacking the all-aspect requirement was released as Blue Sky, which briefly entered service as Fireflash the year before Firestreak.

=== Blue Jay ===
In 1951 the Royal Aircraft Establishment (RAE), in charge of missile development, felt that infrared seeking had progressed to the point of reconsidering the Red Hawk requirement. This too turned out to be too demanding for the seekers of the era, although a more limited tail-aspect design was clearly possible in the short term. This was given the name "Pink Hawk". (Note: This appears to be a nickname, not an official code name.) This led to an official specification for a lower-performance Red Hawk that was released in 1951 as OR.1117, and given the Ministry of Supply rainbow codename Blue Jay.

Blue Jay developed as a fairly conventional-looking missile with cropped delta wings mounted just aft of the midpoint and small rectangular control surfaces in tandem towards the rear. Internally, things were considerably more complex. The tube-based electronics took up most of the forward quarter of the fuselage, leaving little room for a warhead. This led to the warhead being moved to the rear of the fuselage where it was wrapped around the rocket nozzle. That left no room for the actuators for the rear-mounted control fins, which were instead operated by nose-mounted actuators via long pushrods. The actuators were powered by compressed air from bottles at the extreme rear, fed forward through long pipes. The air bottles also powered a turbo-alternator for electrical power after launch. In the case of a miss, the missile self-destructed when the alternator slowed down after the air ran out.

The Magpie rocket motor took up only a small portion of the missile fuselage, placed between the actuators and the warhead, roughly centred under the mid-mounted wings. It consisted of 61 pounds (28 kg) of cordite that burned for 1.9 seconds, exiting the rear of the missile via a long tailpipe running through the rear section of the missile.

The lead telluride (PbTe) IR seeker was mounted under an eight-faceted conical arsenic trisulphide "pencil" nose and was cooled to −180 °C (−292.0 °F) to improve the signal-to-noise ratio. The unusual faceted nose was chosen when a more conventional hemispherical nose proved prone to ice accretion. The seeker was cooled by running filtered air through an ammonia-cooled heat exchanger.

There were two rows of triangular windows in bands around the forward fuselage, behind which sat the optical proximity fuzes for the warhead. The prodigious 19.3 pounds (8.8 kg) warhead had a 40 feet (12 m) lethal radius and was triggered either by the proximity fuzes or four contact fuses set on the front of the wings. The outer casing of the warhead was designed to fragment into 0.25-ounce (7.1 g) pieces fired forward in a 50 degree cone.

The electronics, made from vacuum tubes, generated significant heat. For this reason, the Firestreak missile undergoing a ground test was cooled by Arcton, and in-flight by ammonia pumped through the missile from bottles in the rear of the launching "shoe". The bottles contained enough ammonia for 15 minutes, so the missile could only be started up during the approach. An air bottle in the fuselage-mounted weapon pack kept the ammonia bottles pressurized before launch. Hot air from the engine compressor stages connected to the rear of the launch pack and was routed to the missiles. During flight, this kept various moving components warm, warm enough that they would not freeze up during the 13 second flight time.

== Service ==
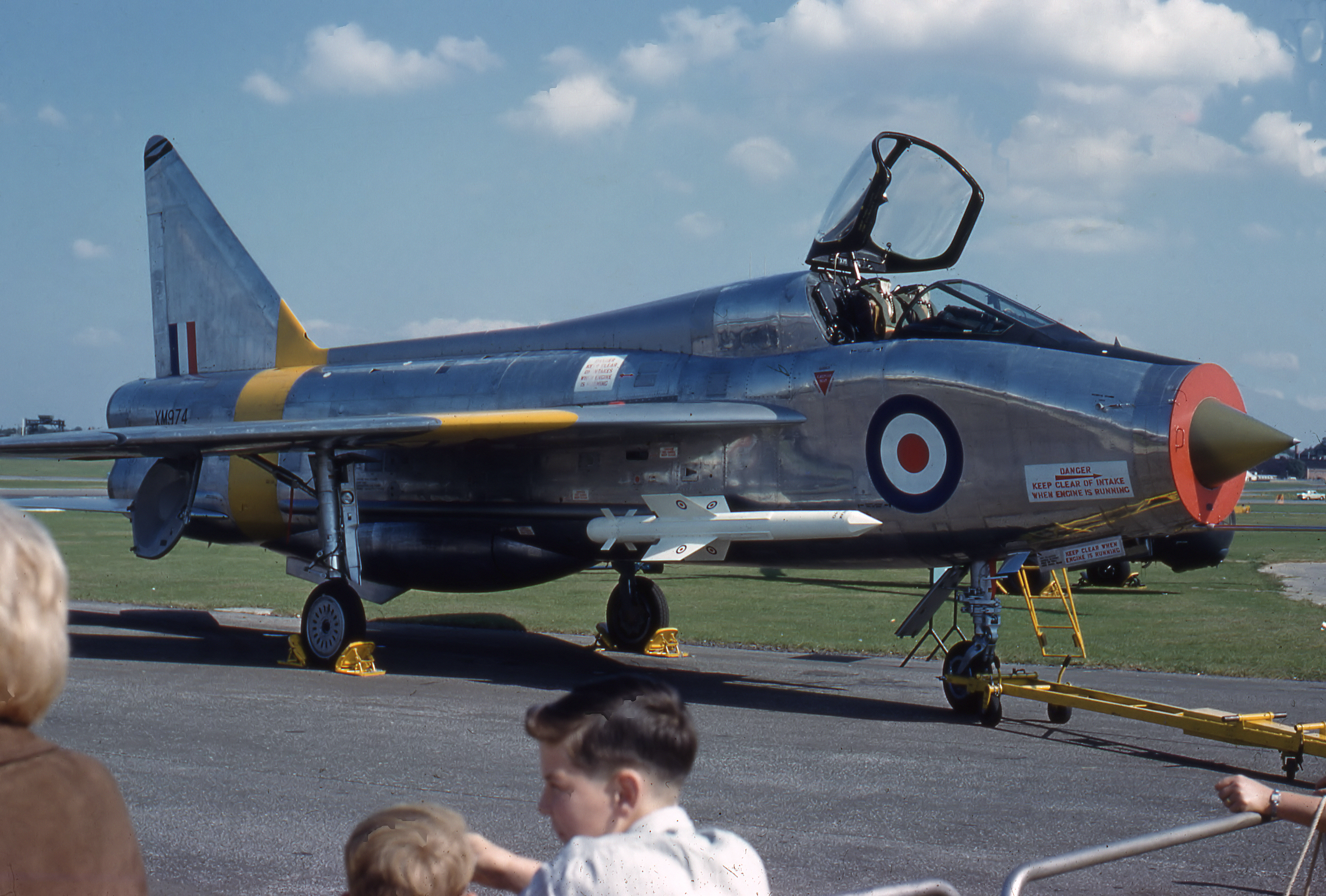
Lightning T4 trainer with a dummy Firestreak missile drill round (1964)

The first airborne launch of Blue Jay took place in 1954 from a de Havilland Venom, the target drone - a Fairey Firefly - being destroyed. Blue Jay Mk.1 entered service in 1957 with the RAF, where it was named Firestreak. Firestreak was deployed by the Royal Navy and the RAF in August 1958; it was the first effective British air-to-air missile.

For launch, the missile seeker was slaved to the launch aircraft's radar (Ferranti AIRPASS in the Lightning and GEC AI.18 in the Sea Vixen) until lock was achieved and the weapon was launched, leaving the interceptor free to acquire another target. A downside was that the missile was highly toxic (due to either the Magpie rocket motor or the ammonia coolant) and RAF armourers had to wear some form of CRBN protection to safely mount the missile onto an aircraft. "Unlike modern [1990s] missiles, ... Firestreak could only be fired outside cloud, and in winter, skies were rarely clear over the UK."

== Improvements ==
Two minor Blue Jay variants were studied but not adopted. The Blue Jay Mk.2 included the more powerful Magpie II motor and a PbTe seeker which had better detection capabilities. Blue Jay Mk.3 had an increased wingspan and reduced-performance motor. This motor would limit the speed attained by the missile beyond the speed at which it had been launched. Otherwise, when launched from supersonic rocket-powered interceptors such as the Saunders-Roe SR.177 and Avro 720, the missile speed would cause its outer skin to become too hot (from aerodynamic heating).

Looking for an improved weapon for the Operational Requirement F.155 interceptors, in 1955 the Air Ministry issued OR.1131 for an all-aspect design capability against enemy aircraft traveling at Mach 2. De Havilland responded with Blue Jay Mk.4, which was later given its own rainbow code, Blue Vesta. This adopted the PbTe seeker of Mk.2, further improved by cooling it to improve its sensitivity in what became known as the "Violet Banner" seeker. The motor was further upgraded to the new Magpie III. To handle the aerodynamic heating issues, the fins were made of steel rather than aluminum, and featured cut-away sections to keep the rear portions of the surfaces out of the Mach cones, a feature they referred to as "mach tips". (Note: More widely known today as a cropped delta.) Work on Mk.4 was curtailed after 1956 as the RAE decided that the closing speeds of two Mach 2+ aircraft would be so rapid that the missile would have no chance to be launched while still within the range of its seeker.

In August 1956, the Fleet Air Arm took over development of the Blue Jay line with Blue Jay Mk.5, replacing the IR seeker with a semi-active radar homing (SARH) system intended to be used with the De Havilland Sea Vixen's AI.18 radar with a special continual wave illuminator mode. This was otherwise identical to Mk.4, differing only by replacing its seeker section with a longer ogive nose cone holding the radar receiver antenna. Problems fitting the illuminator antenna to the Sea Vixen ended work on this project. In November 1957 it was briefly restarted under the name Blue Dolphin as other radar-guided developments ended, but this was never deployed.

== Red Top ==
After the fallout of the 1957 Defence White Paper led to the cancellation of the F.155 and many other aircraft and missile projects, the English Electric Lightning was allowed to continue largely because development was almost complete. This left it with no modern weapon, so Blue Vesta was reactivated in a slightly modified form. In November 1957, paperwork with the Blue Vesta name on it was considered disclosed and the project was assigned the new name "Red Top".

In contrast to the Mk.4 there were several important changes. The adoption of transistorized circuits in place of the former thermionic valves eliminated the need for cooling the electronics, as well as making the guidance section significantly smaller. This allowed the warhead to be moved from its former position near the tail to the midsection, which also allowed it to grow in size and weight, replacing the former blast-fragmentation type with an expanding-rod system that was significantly deadlier. The rear section of the missile was now left empty, allowing the fin actuators to be moved there, removing the complex routing. This still left more room that was used up by replacing the Magpie III with the new Linnet, which offered significantly higher performance and boosted the typical top speed of the missile from Mach 2.4 to 3.2 whilst almost doubling effective range to 7.5 miles (12.1 km).

Given the elimination of the ammonia cooling, which was also used by the Violet Banner seeker of the Mk.4, the decision was made to use a simplified seeker that did not require cooling to the same level. This led to a new indium antimonide (InSb) design that was cooled with purified air at 3,000 psi (21 MPa) filtered to 3 μm. This reduced its sensitivity compared to Violet Banner, lacking its true all-aspect ability, but further simplified the design and eliminated ground handling concerns.

Never given its own name by the RAF, the new design entered service in 1964 as Red Top. It was faster and had a longer range than Firestreak, and "was capable of all aspect homing against super-sonic targets." Despite Red Top being intended to replace Firestreak, Firestreak remained in limited service until the final retirement of the Lightning in 1988; to carry Red Top required more vertical tail area to counter the destabilizing effect of the missile's larger wings, so Firestreak remained in use on older models of the Lightning.

== Operators ==
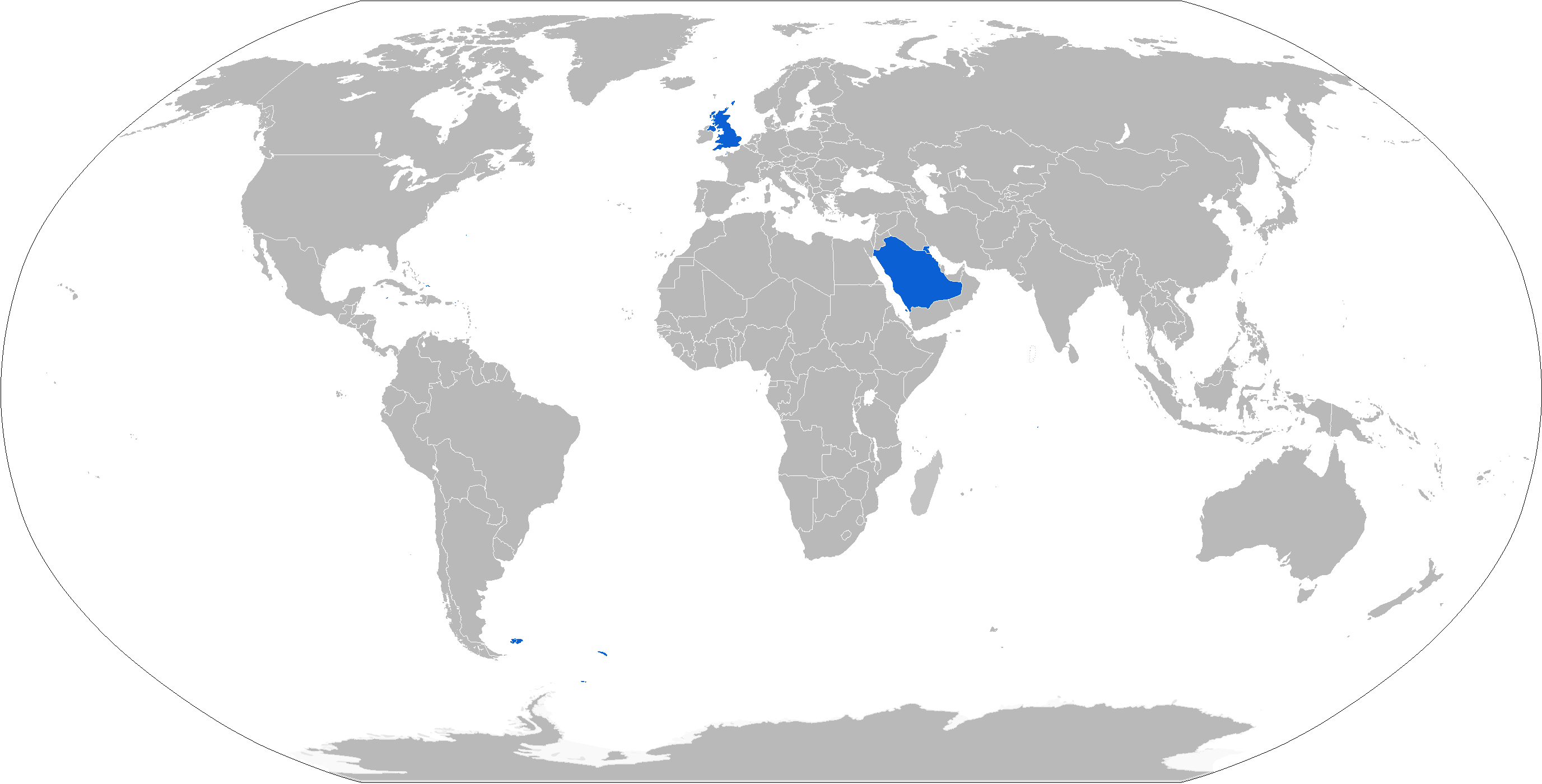
Map with Firestreak operators in blue

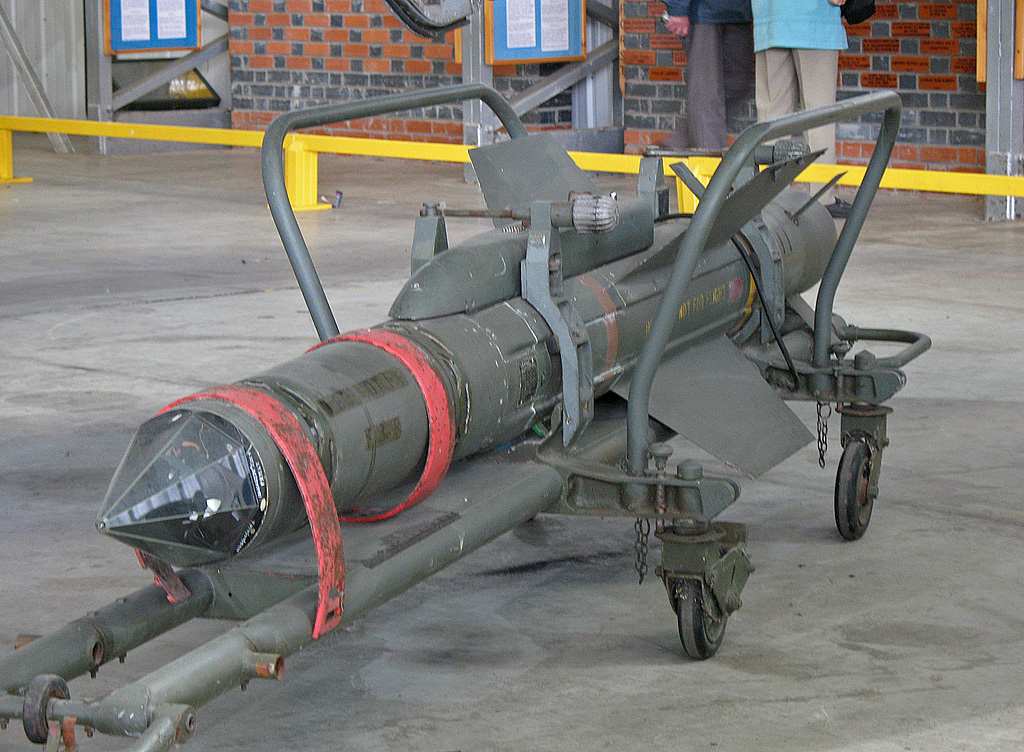
A Firestreak on its trolley. The fuse windows are visible adjacent to the red rubber bands used to protect them.

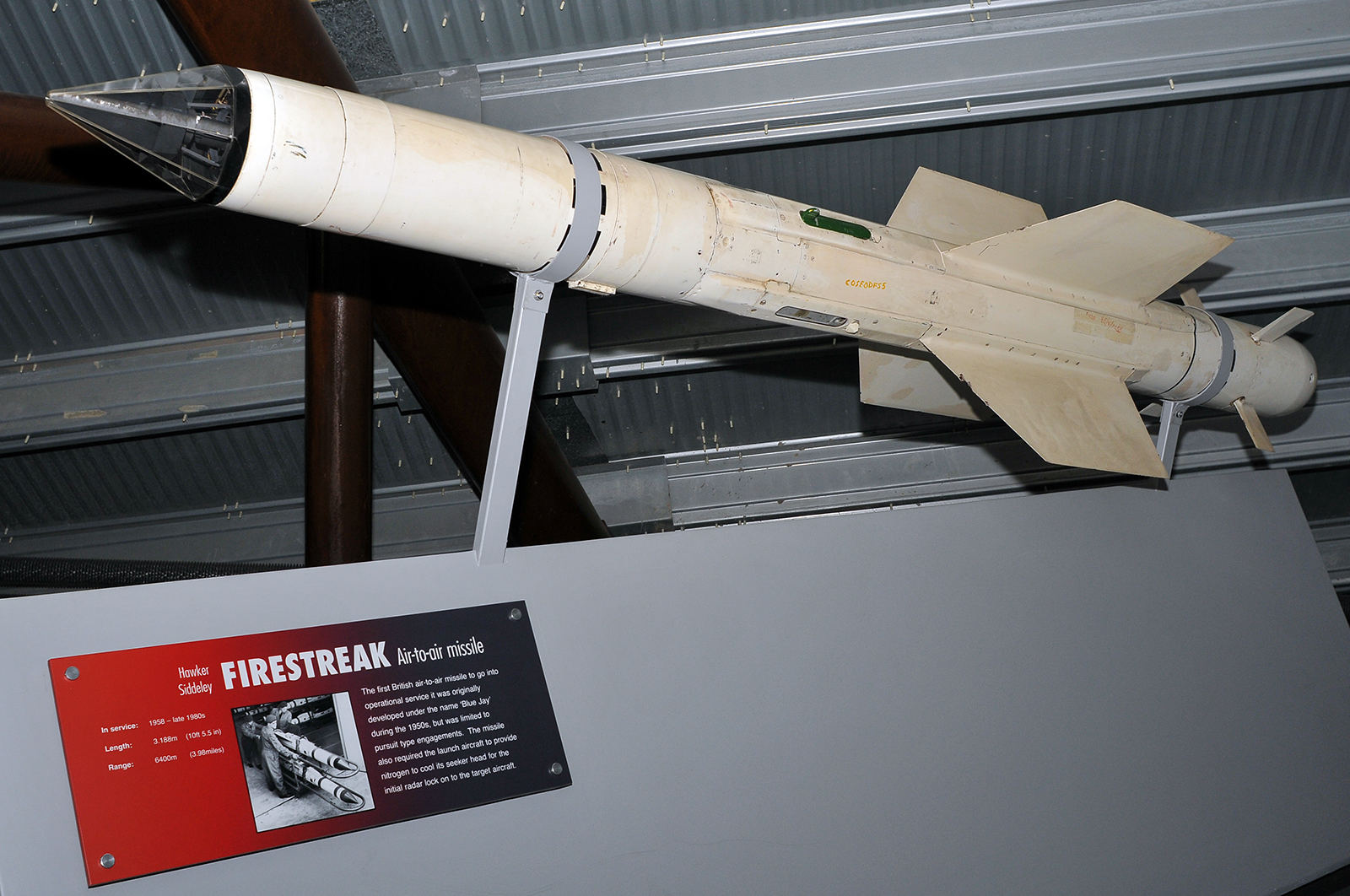
Firestreak at RAF Museum Cosford

=== Past operators ===
Kuwait

- Kuwait Air Force

Saudi Arabia

- Royal Saudi Air Force

United Kingdom

- Royal Air Force
- Royal Navy, Fleet Air Arm
