= Tactical control radar =

British military term

Tactical Control is a term originating in the British Army to refer to a class of medium-range radar systems. They are generally used for controlling the airspace around a set location on the ground, sometimes a dispersed battery of anti-aircraft artillery or surface-to-air missiles, but they also found use as air traffic control systems around airbases. They generally have a high pulse repetition frequency and rotate quickly in order to provide rapid updates at the expense of reduced range.

In the British Army, these radars were initially grouped into the Radar, AA, No. 4 classification, with several Marks of such systems being used from the early World War II period into the early 1960s. The main purpose of these radars was to provide early warning to weapons crews, as well as "putting on" information so they could aim their gun laying radars in the general direction of the target. In the post-war era, this data was handed off electronically.

When the RAF took over many of the Army's air defence duties in 1953, they also took over some of the Army's former radar systems, including their new tactical control system, Orange Yeoman. They assigned these an Air Ministry Experimental Station (AMES) number and generally referred to them by this number, Type 82. The term "tactical control" remained in use during this period, and has seen some usage by other forces.
