= Z Battery =

British Anti-aircraft rocket launcher

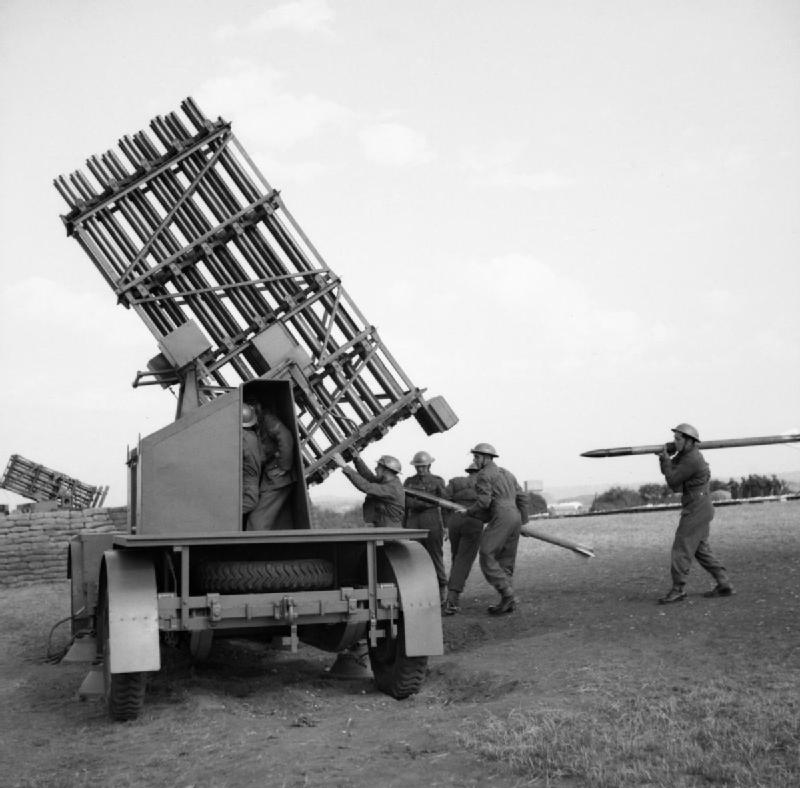
Gunners of the Royal Artillery load a mobile multiple launcher, June 1941

A Z Battery was a short range anti-aircraft weapon system, launching 3 in (76 mm) diameter rockets from ground-based single and multiple launchers, for the air defence of Great Britain in the Second World War. The rocket motors were later adapted with a new warhead for air-to-ground use as the RP-3.

== Development ==
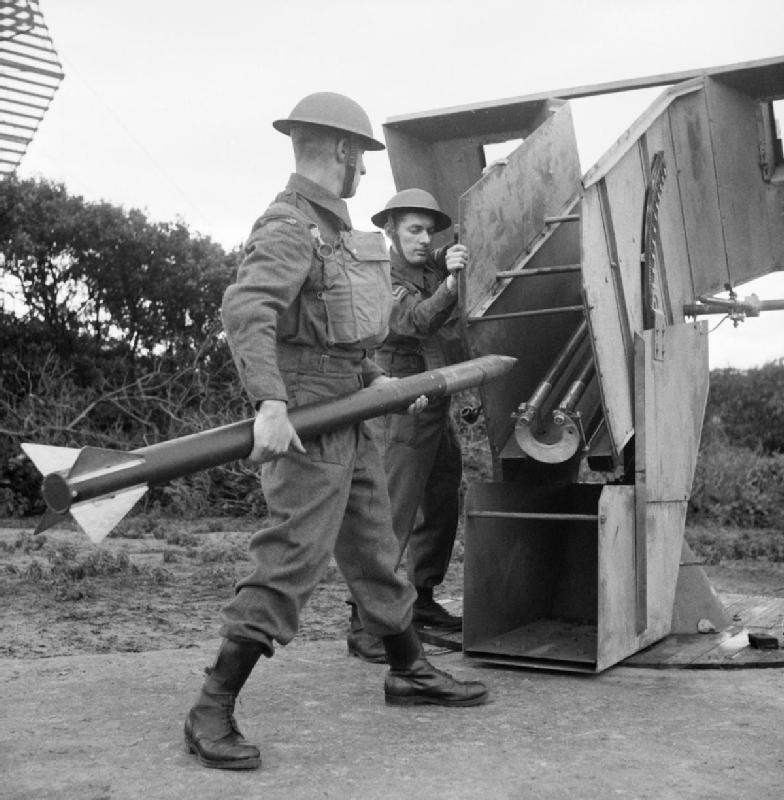
Home Guards load a rocket launcher on a static 'Z' Battery on Merseyside, July 1942

The solid-fuel 3 in (76 mm) rocket used by the Z Batteries was known as the UP-3 (Unrotated Projectile) and had been developed in the late 1930s by the Projectile Development Establishment at Fort Halstead in Kent under the direction of Alwyn Crow. The naval weapon had been enthusiastically backed by Winston Churchill when he was First Lord of the Admiralty at the outbreak of war. By June 1940, Churchill was Prime Minister and he requested "large supplies of [rocket] projectors" for the anti-aircraft defence of the mainland. The development of British rockets was under the control of Professor Frederick Lindemann and he enthusiastically backed Churchill's suggestion.

The naval weapon was intended to bring down low-flying aircraft with a trailing wire, at the end of which was an explosive mine; the land-based system was intended to have a high explosive warhead, detonated by a specially designed photoelectric (PE) proximity fuse. The rocket was propelled by special solvent-free cordite, which was initially manufactured at ROF Bishopton in Scotland; in December 1940, a new propellant factory was commissioned at Ranskill, which was in production by the start of 1942. By August 1940, more than 7,000 rocket projectors were available to Anti-Aircraft Command but the output of rockets lagged and by April only 18,600 had been made, of which Anti-Aircraft Command was allocated 8,400, preference being granted to the Admiralty; the command was only able to operate 840 launchers with ten rockets apiece.

In October 1940, an experimental Z Battery became operational at Cardiff in South Wales under the command of Major Duncan Sandys, Churchill's son-in-law. (Note: Sandys had been injured in the recent Norwegian campaign while with the 51st (London) HAA Regiment.) Trials against a radio-controlled Queen Bee target aircraft were successful, although the Director of Artillery at the Ministry of Supply suspected that the results were "fixed". Despite this Churchill and Lindemann drove the project forward and by 1942, 2.4 million rockets were being produced annually.

== Service ==
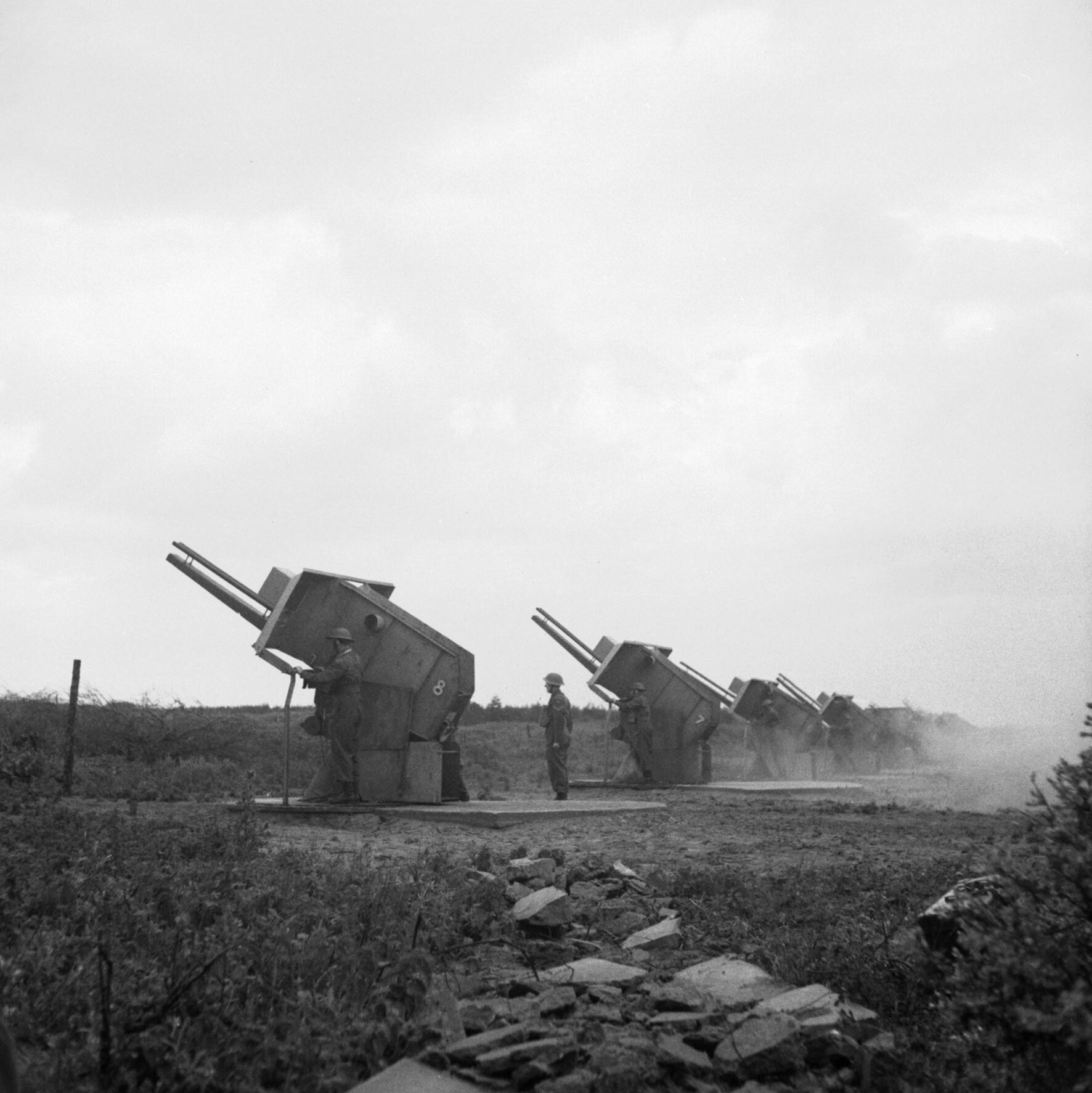
Z Battery manned by the Home Guard on Merseyside in July 1942

The first Z Batteries were equipped with a single-rocket launcher, the Projector, 3-inch, Mark 1. It was soon found that the rockets did not perform as accurately as the trials had suggested and that the proximity fuses were rarely effective. Salvo-fire was introduced and projectors capable of firing an ever-larger number of rockets were developed. The Projector, 3-inch, No 2, Mk 1 was a twin launcher and the No 4 Mk 1 and Mk 2 fired ripples of 36 rockets.

On Sunday 18 August during the Battle of Britain, in a surprise attack on RAF Kenley by Dornier Do 17 bombers, AC2 David Roberts brought down one of the two attacking aircraft that were destroyed, using the RAF's newest anti-aircraft weapon, a line of twenty-five rockets that deployed a barrage of 500 ft (150 m) cables suspended on parachutes. This weapon, the naval version of the Z Barrage, was an example of the motley of weapons issued to the RAF in the early war years. The other Dornier 17 was shot down by Corporal John Miller of the Scots Guards, using a Lewis gun; both men were awarded the Military Medal.

From early 1942, the manning of Z Batteries began to be transferred to the Home Guard, as the equipment was comparatively simple to operate and the rounds were lighter. The age limit for Home Guards to work on Z Batteries was 60, whereas it was 40 for those posted to conventional anti-aircraft guns and coast defence batteries, because of the heavier ammunition.

== Ground attack version ==
The No 2 and No 4 projectors were used in the North African Campaign, mounted on converted QF 3-inch 20 cwt gun trailers. The emergency use of a No 4 projector against an Axis infantry attack in that theatre provided the inspiration for the No 8 Projector, better known as the Land Mattress, a surface-to-surface rocket system, used by the Canadian Army in 1945. The UP-3 rocket was also developed into the RP-3 air-to-ground anti-tank rocket.

== See also ==
- AA Mine Discharger, a Japanese anti-aircraft mortar.
- Holman Projector, a steam-powered anti-aircraft grenade launcher.
- Henschel Hs 297 / 7.3 cm Föhn-Gerät, a German anti-aircraft rocket system.
- Bethnal Green disaster

== Bibliography ==
- Bishop, Chris (2002). The Encyclopedia of Weapons of World War II. Metrobooks. ISBN 978-1-58663-762-0.
- Collier, B. (2004) [1957]. Butler, J. R. M. (ed.). The Defence of the United Kingdom. History of the Second World War United Kingdom Military Series (facs. pbk. repr. Naval & Military Press, Uckfield ed.). London: HMSO. ISBN 978-1-845-74055-9 – via Hyperwar Foundation.
- Dobinson, Colin (2001). AA Command: Britain's Anti-Aircraft Defences of the Second World War. London: Methuen. ISBN 0-413-76540-7.
- Edgerton, David (2012). Britain's War Machine: Weapons, Resources, and Experts in the Second World War. London: Penguin Books. ISBN 978-0-14-102610-7.
- Longmate, Norman (1974). The Real Dad's Army: The Story of the Home Guard. Amberley. ISBN 978-1-84868-914-5.
- Oliver, Kingsley (2002). The RAF Regiment at War. Barnsley: Pen & Sword. ISBN 0-85052-852-6.
