= Japanese aircraft carrier Shinano =

Aircraft carrier of the Imperial Japanese Navy

Shinano
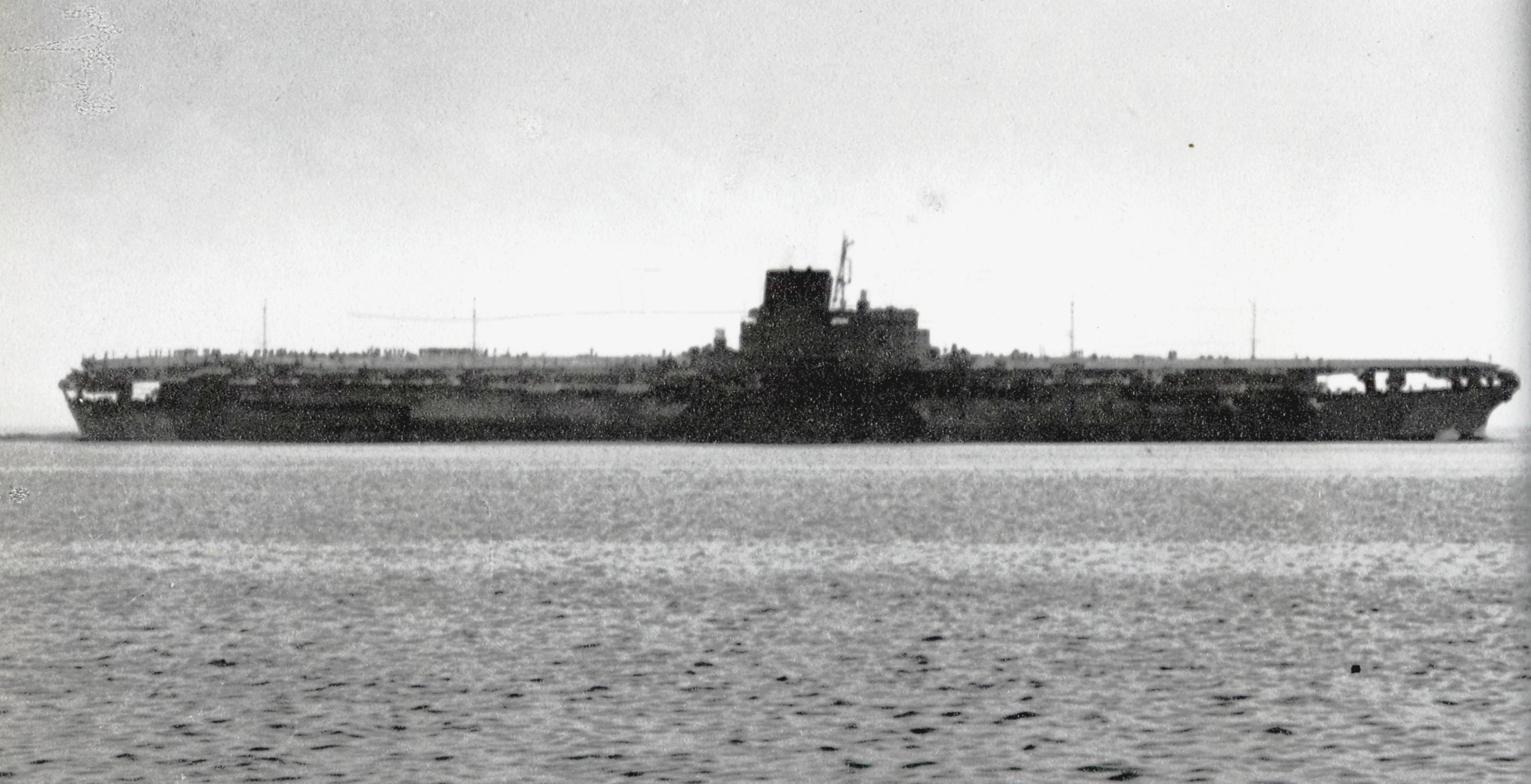
- Shinano underway during her sea trials in Tokyo Bay, 11 November 1944, taken from a civilian tugboat

History

Japan
- Name: Shinano
- Namesake: Shinano Province
- Builder: Yokosuka Naval Arsenal
- Laid down: 4 May 1940
- Launched: 8 October 1944
- Completed: 19 November 1944 (for trials)
- Fate: Sunk by the submarine USS Archerfish, 29 November 1944

General characteristics
- Type: Aircraft carrier
- Displacement: 65,800 t (64,800 long tons) (standard)
- Length: 265.8 m (872 ft 2 in) (o/a)
- Beam: 36.3 m (119 ft 1 in)
- Draught: 10.3 m (33 ft 10 in)
- Installed power: 12 × water-tube boilers; 150,000 shp (110,000 kW)
- Propulsion: 4 × shafts; 4 × geared steam turbines
- Speed: 28 knots (52 km/h; 32 mph)
- Range: 10,000 nmi (19,000 km; 12,000 mi) at 18 knots (33 km/h; 21 mph)
- Complement: 2,400
- Armament: 8 × twin 12.7 cm (5 in) DP guns; 35 × triple 2.5 cm (1 in) AA guns; 12 × 28-barrel 12 cm (4.7 in) AA rocket launchers
- Armor: Waterline belt: 160–400 mm (6.3–15.7 in); Flight deck: 75 mm (3 in)
- Aircraft carried: 47

Shinano (Japanese: 信濃; named after the ancient Shinano Province) was an aircraft carrier built by the Imperial Japanese Navy (IJN) during World War II, the largest such built up to that time. Laid down in May 1940 as the third of the Yamato-class battleships, Shinano's partially complete hull was ordered to be converted to an aircraft carrier following Japan's disastrous loss of four of its original six fleet carriers at the Battle of Midway in mid-1942. The advanced state of her construction prevented her conversion into a fleet carrier, so the IJN decided to convert her into a carrier that supported other carriers.

Her conversion was still not finished in November 1944 when she was ordered to sail from the Yokosuka Naval Arsenal to Kure Naval Base to complete fitting out and transfer a load of 50 Yokosuka MXY7 Ohka rocket-propelled kamikaze flying bombs. She was sunk en route, 10 days after commissioning, on 29 November 1944, by four torpedoes from the U.S. Navy submarine Archerfish. Over 1000 sailors and civilians were rescued and 1,435 were lost, including her captain. She remains the largest ship ever sunk by a submarine.

== Design and description ==
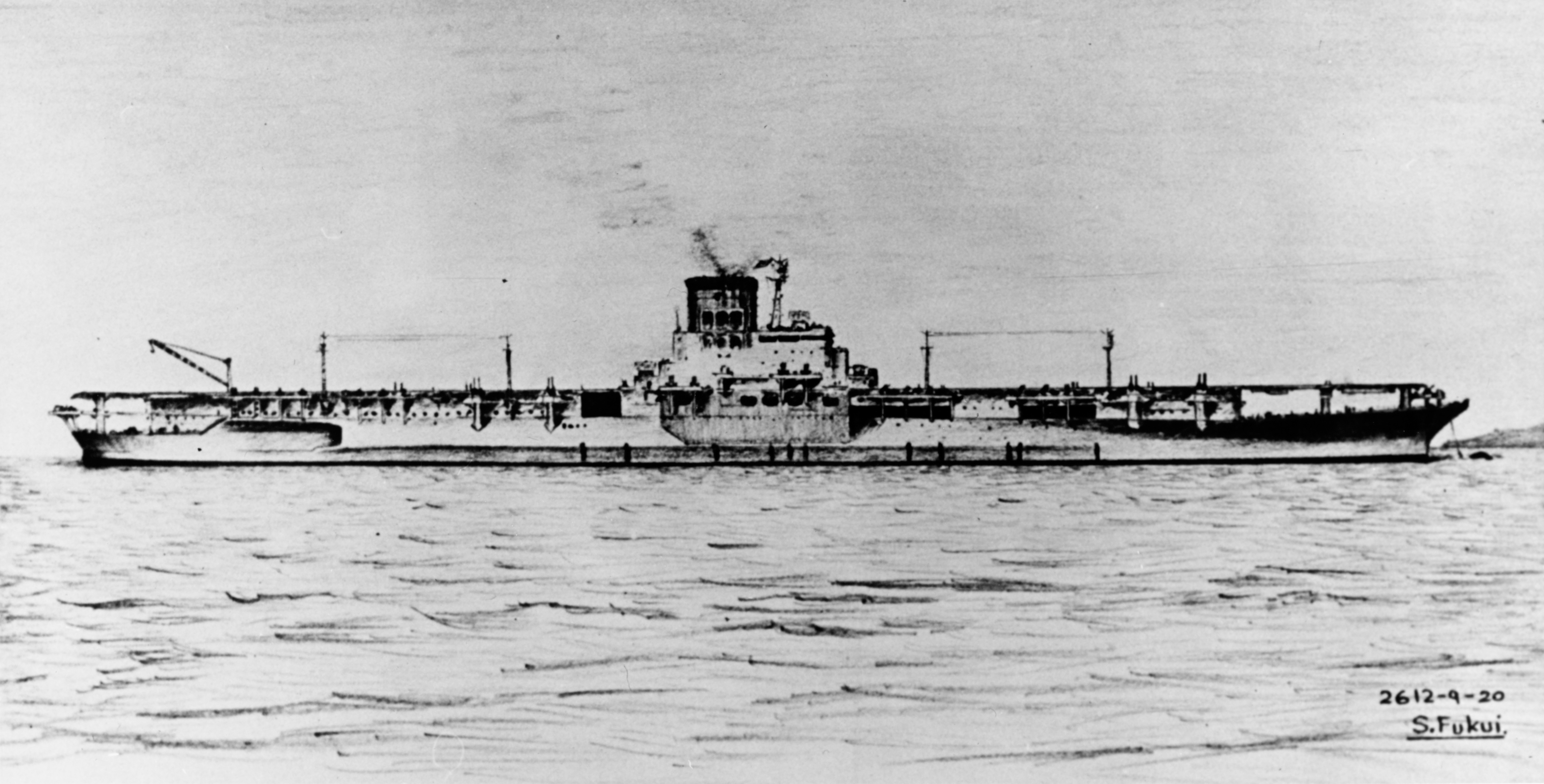
Drawing of the Shinano as she appeared on 19 November 1944

One of two additional Yamato-class battleships ordered as part of the 4th Naval Armaments Supplement Program of 1939, Shinano was named after the old province of Shinano, following the Japanese ship-naming conventions for battleships. She was laid down on 4 May 1940 at the Yokosuka Naval Arsenal to a modified Yamato-class design; her armor would be 10–20 mm (0.4–0.8 in) thinner than that of the earlier ships, as it had proved to be thicker than it needed to be for the desired level of protection, and her heavy antiaircraft (AA) guns would be the new 65-caliber 10 cm Type 98 dual-purpose gun, as it had superior ballistic characteristics and a higher rate of fire than the 40-caliber 12.7 cm Type 89 guns used by her half-sisters.

=== Construction and conversion ===
As with Shinano's half-sisters Yamato and Musashi, the new ship's existence was kept a closely guarded secret. A tall fence was erected on three sides of the graving dock, and those working on the conversion were confined to the yard compound. Serious punishment—up to and including death—awaited any worker who mentioned the new ship. As a result, Shinano was the only major warship built in the 20th century that was never officially photographed during her construction. The ship is only known to have been photographed on three occasions. The first photograph, taken by a Japanese aircraft in mid-October 1944, was intended to review the camouflage efforts made to conceal the carrier while in drydock. Later, on 1 November 1944, a Boeing B-29 Superfortress reconnaissance aircraft captured Shinano near the entrance of Yokosuka Harbor from an altitude of 9,800 m (32,000 ft). Ten days later a civilian photographer aboard a harbor tug photographed Shinano's initial sea trials in Tokyo Bay.

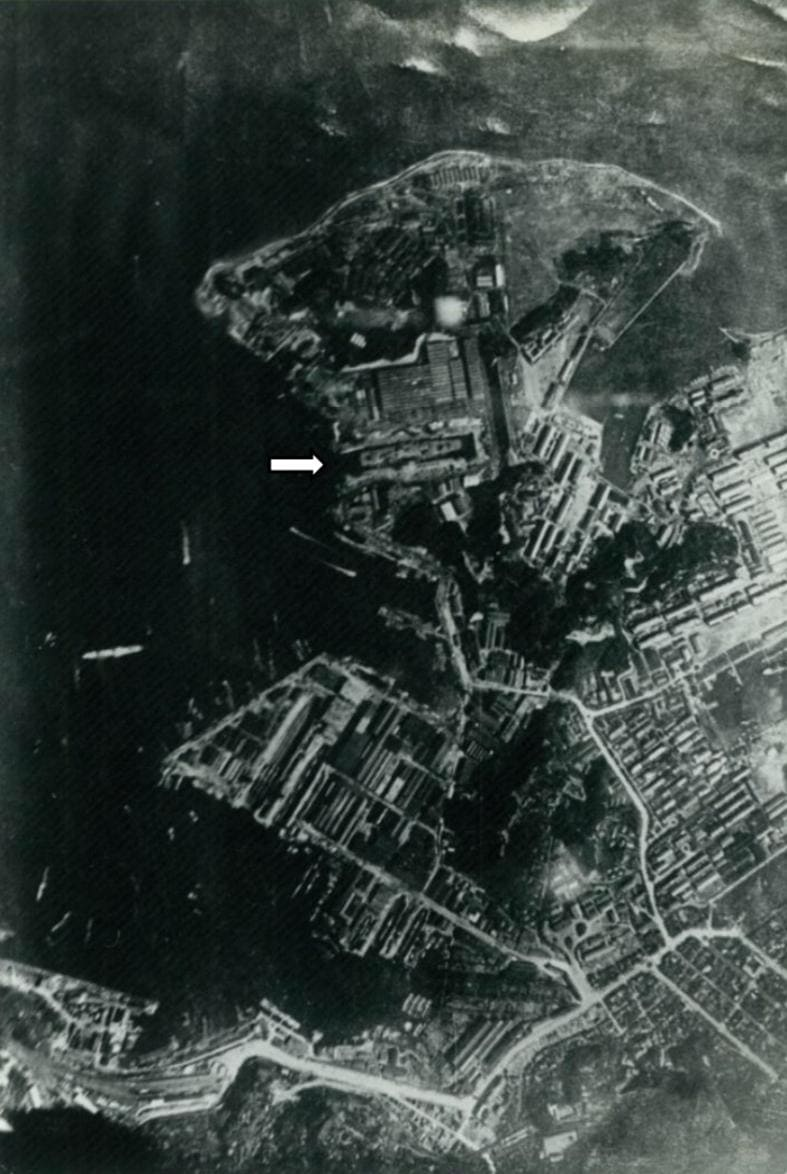
A test photo of Shinano (pointed to by arrow) drydocked in Yokosuka to view her camouflage, October 1944: Several false buildings are seen on her flight deck. This is the only known image of the ship taken by the Japanese military.

In December 1941, construction on Shinano's hull was temporarily suspended to allow the IJN time to decide what to do with the ship. She was not expected to be completed until 1945, and the sinking of the British capital ships Prince of Wales and Repulse by IJN bombers had called into question the viability of battleships in the war. The navy also wanted to make the large drydock in which the ship was being built available, which required either scrapping the portion already completed or finishing it enough to launch it and clear the drydock. The IJN decided on the latter, albeit with a reduced work force, which was expected to be able to launch the ship in one year.

In the month following the disastrous loss of four fleet carriers at the June 1942 Battle of Midway, the IJN ordered the ship's unfinished hull to be converted into an aircraft carrier. Her hull was only 45% complete by that time, with structural work complete up to the lower deck and most of her machinery installed. The main deck, lower side armor, and upper side armor around the ship's magazines had been completely installed, and the forward barbettes for the main guns were also nearly finished. The navy decided that Shinano would become a heavily armored support carrier—carrying reserve aircraft, fuel and ordnance in support of other carriers—rather than a fleet carrier.

As completed, Shinano had a length of 265.8 m (872 ft 1 in) overall, a beam of 36.3 m (119 ft 1 in) and a draft of 10.3 m (33 ft 10 in). She displaced 65,800 t (64,800 long tons) at standard load, 69,151 t (68,059 long tons) at normal load and 73,000 t (72,000 long tons) at full load. Shinano was the heaviest aircraft carrier yet built, a record she held until the 81,000-metric-ton (80,000-long-ton) USS Forrestal was launched in 1954. She was designed for a crew of 2,400 officers and enlisted men.

=== Machinery ===
Shinano's machinery was identical to that of her half-sisters. The ships were fitted with four geared steam turbine sets with a total of 150,000 shaft horsepower (110,000 kW), each driving one propeller shaft, using steam provided by 12 Kampon water-tube boilers. The ships had a designed speed of 27 knots (50 km/h; 31 mph), but Shinano never conducted full-speed sea trials, so her actual performance is unknown. She carried 9,047 t (8,904 long tons) of fuel oil, which gave her an estimated range of 10,000 nautical miles (19,000 km; 12,000 mi) at 18 knots (33 km/h; 21 mph).

=== Flight deck and hangar ===
Shinano was designed to load and fuel her aircraft on deck which was safer for the ship; experiences in the Battles of Midway and the Coral Sea had demonstrated that the existing doctrine of fueling and arming their aircraft below decks was a real danger to the carriers if they were attacked while doing so. Much of Shinano's hangar was left open for better ventilation, although steel shutters could close off most of the hangar sides if necessary. This also allowed ordnance or burning aircraft to be jettisoned into the sea, which the earlier carriers could not do with their enclosed hangars.

The carrier's 256 m (839 ft 11 in) flight deck was 40 m (131 ft 3 in) wide and overhung her hull at both ends, supported by pairs of pillars. A large island, modeled on that fitted on the earlier Taihō, was sponsoned off the starboard side and integrated with the ship's funnel. Much like Taihō, the only other Japanese carrier with an armored flight deck, Shinano's flight deck functioned as the ship's strength deck and copied British practice as seen in their Illustrious-class carriers. Designed to resist penetration by 500 kg (1,100 lb) bombs dropped by a dive bomber, the flight deck consisted of 75 mm (3 in) of armor plate laid over 20 mm (0.8 in) of ordinary steel. It was equipped with 15 transverse arrestor wires and three crash barriers that could stop a 7,500 kg (16,500 lb) aircraft; five of these wires were positioned further forward to allow the ship to land aircraft over the bow in case the aft portion of the flight deck were unusable.

Unlike the British carriers, Taihō and Shinano had unarmored sides to their hangars. For stability reasons, the latter only had a single hangar that was 163.4 by 33.8 m (536 by 111 ft), with a minimum width of 19.8 m (65 ft) aft, and had a height of 5 m (16 ft 6 in). The forward area of the hangar was dedicated to maintenance and storage facilities. Aircraft were transported between the hangar and the flight deck by two elevators, one at each end of the hangar on the centerline of the flight deck. The larger of the two measured 15 by 14 m (49.25 by 45.9 ft). They were capable of lifting aircraft weighing up to 7,500 kg (16,500 lb). The ship had an aviation gasoline (avgas) capacity of 720,000 L (160,000 imp gal; 190,000 US gal). Because Taihō had been sunk by an explosion of avgas fumes, large ventilation fans were installed on the hangar deck to expel fumes in case of damage to the fuel system. Canvas wind scoops could also be rigged over the elevator opening to force more air inside.

The ship's organic air group was intended to consist of 18 Mitsubishi A7M Reppū (Allied reporting name "Sam") fighters (plus two in storage), 18 Aichi B7A Ryusei ("Grace") torpedo-dive bombers (plus two in storage), and 6 Nakajima C6N Saiun ("Myrt") reconnaissance aircraft (plus one in storage). The remainder of the hangar space would have held up to 120 replacement aircraft for other carriers and land bases. The steel flight deck was covered with a thin, shock-absorbent latex-sawdust compound.

=== Armament ===
Shinano's primary armament consisted of sixteen 40-caliber 12.7-centimeter (5 in) Type 89 dual-purpose guns in eight twin mounts, two at each corner of the hull. When firing at surface targets, the guns had a range of 14,700 m (16,100 yd); they had a maximum ceiling of 9,440 m (30,970 ft) at their maximum elevation of 90°. Their maximum rate of fire was 14 rounds a minute; their sustained rate of fire was around 8 rounds per minute.

The ship also carried 105 Type 96 25 mm (1 in) light AA guns in 35 triple-gun mounts. These 25 mm (0.98 in) guns had an effective range of 1,500–3,000 m (1,600–3,300 yd), and an effective ceiling of 5,500 m (18,000 ft) at an elevation of +85°. The maximum effective rate of fire was only between 110 and 120 rounds per minute because of the frequent need to change the 15-round magazines. This was the standard Japanese light AA gun during World War II, but it suffered from severe design shortcomings that rendered it largely ineffective. According to historian Mark Stille, the weapon had many faults, including an inability to "handle high-speed targets because it could not be trained or elevated fast enough by either hand or power, its sights were inadequate for high-speed targets, it possessed excessive vibration and muzzle blast".... These guns were supplemented by a dozen 28-round AA rocket launchers. Each 12 cm (4.7 in) rocket weighed 53 pounds (24 kg) and had a maximum velocity of 200 m/s (660 ft/s). Their maximum range was 4,800 m (5,200 yd).

Four Type 94 high-angle fire-control directors were fitted to control the Type 89 guns. The two controlling the port-side guns were adjacent to their guns, while the starboard directors were mounted fore and aft on the island. They could control all of the forward and rear guns, respectively, as necessary. Type 22 and Type 13 air-search radars may have been fitted.

=== Armor ===
The ship's original waterline armor belt thickness of 400 mm (15.7 in) was retained only where it had already been installed abreast the magazines, and reduced to 160 mm (6.3 in) elsewhere. Below it was a strake of armor that tapered in thickness from 200 to 75 mm (7.9 to 3.0 in) at its bottom edge. The flat portion of the armor deck over the machinery and magazine spaces, ranging from 100 to 190 mm (3.9 to 7.5 in), was retained, and the sloped portion that angled downward towards the bottom of the main armor belt was 230 mm (9.1 in) thick. Large external antitorpedo bulges below the waterline provided the main defense against torpedoes, backed up by an armored bulkhead extending down from the belt armor; the bulkhead was intended to prevent splinters from piercing the main hull, and though not watertight, was backed by a second one that was. The joint between the upper and lower armor belts was weak and proved to be a serious problem when struck by torpedoes.

Though Shinano's avgas tanks were protected by armor that could resist a 155 mm (6.1 in) shell, the IJN attempted to isolate the tanks from the rest of the ship with a cofferdam. The investigation into the loss of Taihō, though, had revealed that her avgas tanks had sprung leaks after she was torpedoed. The resulting fumes then penetrated the cofferdam and exploded. Therefore, the IJN thought it prudent to fill the empty spaces between the tanks and the cofferdam with 2,400 t (2,362 long tons) of concrete to prevent any fumes from escaping.

=== Launching ===
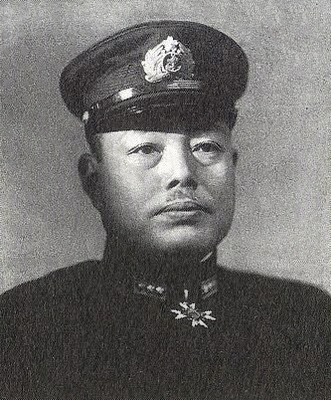
Toshio Abe

The ship was originally scheduled for completion in April 1945, but construction was expedited after the defeat at the Battle of the Philippine Sea in June 1944, as the IJN anticipated that the United States would now be able to bomb Japan with long-range aircraft from bases in the Mariana Islands. The builder was unable to increase the number of workers on Shinano and could not meet the new deadline of October. Therefore, the pressure to finish as quickly as possible led to poor workmanship by the workforce.

Shinano's launch on 8 October 1944, with Captain Toshio Abe in command, was marred by what some considered an ill-omened accident. During the floating-out procedure, one of the caissons at the end of the dock that had not been properly ballasted with seawater unexpectedly lifted as the water rose to the level of the harbor. The sudden inrush of water into the graving dock pushed the carrier into the forward end, damaging the bow structure below the waterline and requiring repairs in drydock. These were completed by 26 October.

== Commissioning and sinking ==
=== Departure from Yokosuka ===
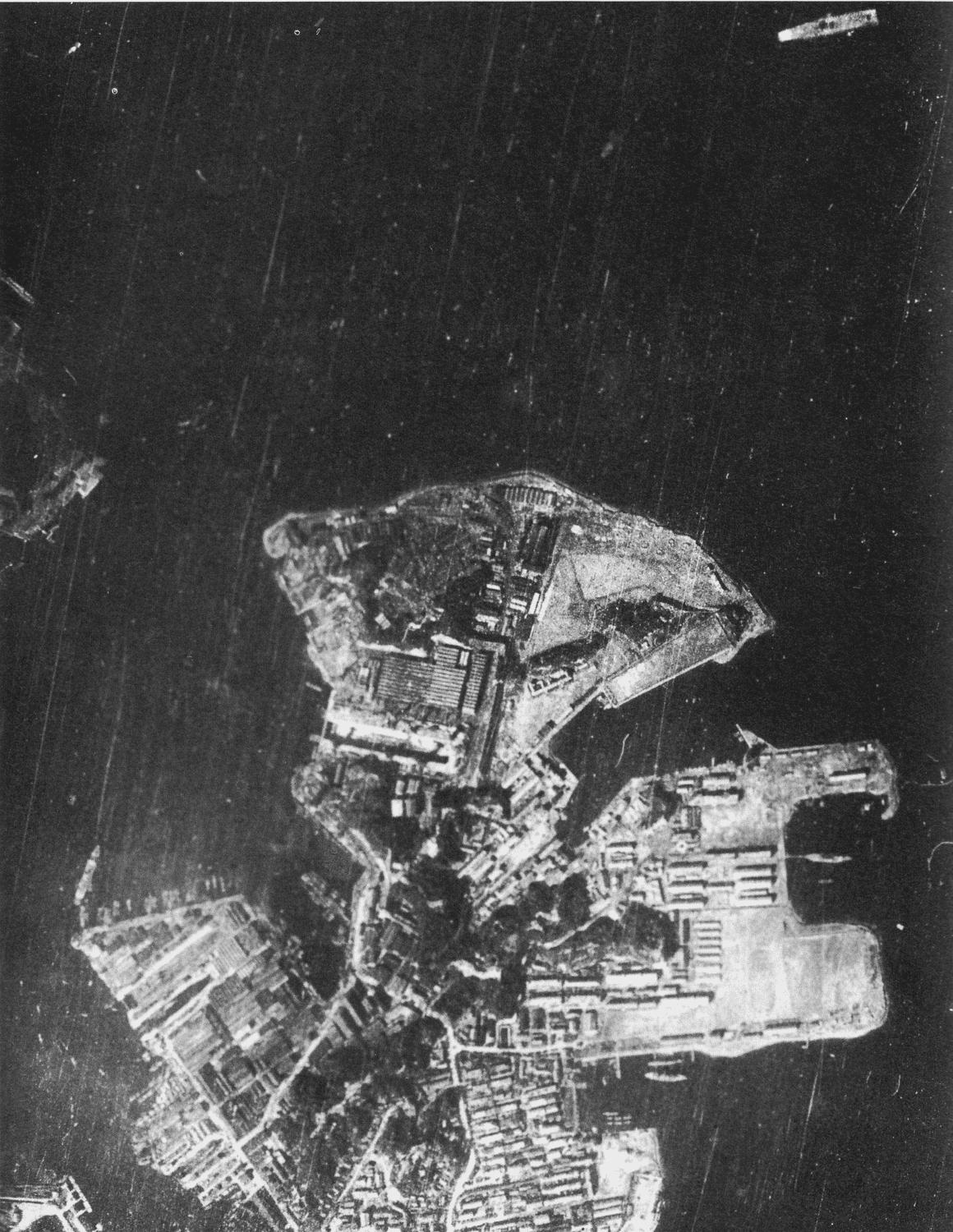
Shinano (top right corner) anchored outside the entrance to Yokosuka harbor, as photographed by a B-29 bomber on 1 November 1944

On 19 November 1944, Shinano was formally commissioned at Yokosuka, having spent the previous two weeks fitting out and performing sea trials. On the same day, a B-29 bomber observed Yokosuka and photographed the base, producing one of only three known pictures of Shinano. Worried about her safety after the fly-over, the Navy General Staff ordered Shinano to depart for Kure by no later than 28 November, where the remainder of her fitting-out would take place. Abe asked for a delay in the sailing date, as the majority of her watertight doors had yet to be installed, the compartment air tests had not been conducted, and many holes in the compartment bulkheads for electrical cables, ventilation ducts, and pipes had not been sealed. Importantly, fire mains and bailing systems lacked pumps and were inoperable; though most of the crew had sea-going experience, they lacked training in the portable pumps on board. He was also concerned for the crews of the escorting destroyers, Isokaze, Yukikaze, and Hamakaze. The destroyers had just returned from the Battle of Leyte Gulf and required more than three days to conduct repairs and to allow their crews to recuperate.

Abe's request was denied, and Shinano departed as scheduled with the escorting destroyers at 18:00 on 28 November. Abe commanded a crew of 2,175 officers and men. Also on board were 300 shipyard workers and 40 civilian employees. Watertight doors and hatches were left open for ease of access to machinery spaces, as were some manholes in the double- and triple-bottomed hull. Abe preferred a daylight passage, since it would have allowed him extra time to train his crew and give the destroyer crews time to rest. However, he was forced to make a nighttime run when he learned the Navy General Staff could not provide air support. Shinano carried six Shinyo suicide boats and 50 Ohka suicide flying bombs; her other aircraft were not planned to come aboard until later. Her orders were to go to Kure, where she would complete fitting out and then deliver the kamikaze craft to the Philippines and Okinawa. Traveling at an average speed of 20 knots (37 km/h; 23 mph), she needed 16 hours to cover the 300 miles (480 km) to Kure. As a measure of how important Shinano was to the naval command, Abe was slated for promotion to rear admiral once the fitting-out was complete.

=== Attacked ===
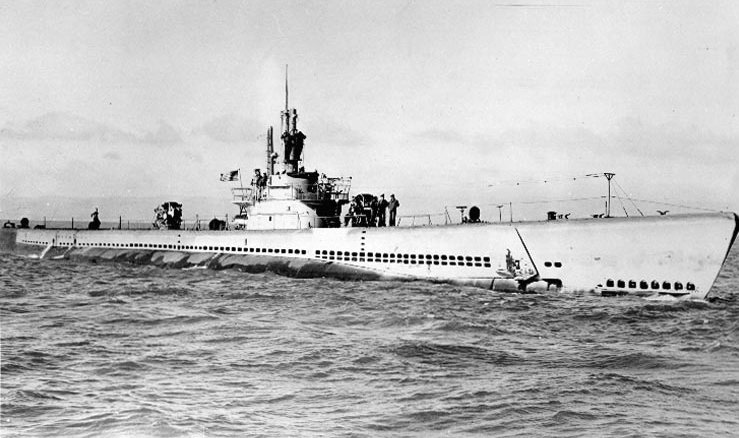
Archerfish on the surface, June 1945

At 20:48, the American submarine Archerfish, commanded by Commander Joseph F. Enright, detected Shinano and her escorts on her radar and pursued them on a parallel course. Over an hour and a half earlier, Shinano had detected the submarine's radar. Normally, Shinano would have been able to outrun Archerfish, but the zig-zagging movement of the carrier and her escorts—intended to evade any American submarines in the area—inadvertently turned the task group back into the Archerfish's path on several occasions. At 22:45, the carrier's lookouts spotted Archerfish on the surface, and Isokaze broke formation, against orders, to investigate. Abe ordered the destroyer to return to the formation without attacking because he believed that the submarine was part of an American wolfpack. He assumed Archerfish was being used as a decoy to lure away one of the escorts to allow the rest of the pack a clear shot at Shinano. He ordered his ships to turn away from the submarine with the expectation of outrunning it, counting on his 2-knot (3.7 km/h; 2.3 mph) margin of speed over the submarine. Around 23:22, the carrier was forced to reduce speed to 18 knots (33 km/h; 21 mph), the same speed as Archerfish, to prevent damage to the propeller shaft when a bearing overheated. At 02:56 on 29 November, Shinano turned to the southwest and headed straight for Archerfish. Eight minutes later, Archerfish turned east and submerged in preparation to attack. A few minutes later, Shinano turned south, exposing her entire side to Archerfish—a nearly ideal firing situation for a submarine. The escorting destroyer on that side passed right over Archerfish without detecting her. At 03:15, Archerfish fired six torpedoes before diving to 400 ft (120 m) to escape a depth-charge attack from the escorts. Enright set his torpedoes to run shallow, at a depth of 10 ft (3.0 m). He not only wanted to ensure they would hit if they ran deeper than set, but also hoped to increase the chances of capsizing the ship by punching holes higher up in the hull.

Four torpedoes struck Shinano, at an average depth of 4.3 m (14 ft). The first hit towards the stern, flooding refrigerated storage compartments and one of the empty avgas storage tanks and killing many of the engineering personnel who were sleeping in the compartments above. The second hit the compartment where the starboard outboard propeller shaft entered the hull and flooded the outboard engine room. The third hit further forward, flooding the No. 3 boiler room and killing every man on watch there. Structural failures caused the two adjacent boiler rooms to flood, as well. The fourth flooded the starboard air compressor room, adjacent AA gun magazines, and the No. 2 damage-control station, and ruptured the adjacent oil tank.

=== Sinking ===
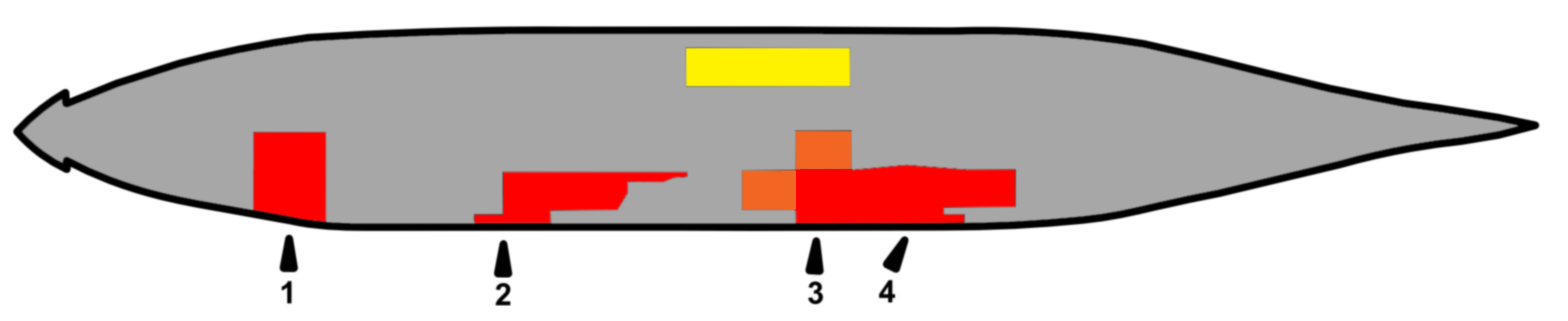
Diagram showing locations of torpedo hits and ensuing flooding: Red shows compartments immediately flooded, orange slowly flooded, and yellow deliberate flooding to offset the ship's list.

Though severe, the damage to Shinano was at first judged to be manageable. The crew was confident in the ship's armor and strength, which translated into lax initial efforts to save the ship. This overconfidence extended to Abe. He doubted the sub's torpedoes could inflict serious damage, since he knew that American torpedoes were less potent than Japanese torpedoes. He ordered the carrier to maintain her maximum speed even after the last torpedo hit. This pushed more water through the holes in the hull, resulting in extensive flooding. Within a few minutes, the ship was listing 10° to starboard. Despite the crew pumping 3,000 long tons (3,000 t) of water into the port bilges, the list increased to 13°. When the damage being more severe than first thought became apparent, Abe ordered a change of course towards Shiono Point, the southernmost tip of Honshu's Kii Peninsula. Progressively increasing flooding increased the list to 15° by 03:30. About 50 minutes later, Abe ordered the empty port outboard tanks to be counter-flooded, reducing the list to 12° for a brief time. After 05:00, he ordered the civilian workers to be transferred to the escorts, as they were impeding the crew in their duties.

A half-hour later, Shinano was making 10 knots with a 13° list. At 06:00, her list had increased to 20° after the starboard boiler room flooded, when the valves of the port trimming tanks rose above the waterline and became ineffective. The engines shut down for lack of steam around 07:00, and Abe ordered all of the propulsion compartments evacuated an hour later. He then ordered the three outboard port boiler rooms flooded in a futile attempt to reduce the carrier's list. He also ordered Hamakaze and Isokaze to take her in tow. However, the two destroyers displaced only 5,000 metric tons (4,900 long tons) between them, about 7% of Shinano's displacement and not nearly enough to overcome her deadweight. The first tow cables snapped under the strain, and the second attempt was aborted for fear of injury to the crews if they snapped again. The ship lost all power around 09:00 and was now listing over 20°. While Abe refused to issue any formal orders to abandon ship, at 10:18, he realized the situation was untenable and released the crew to save themselves. At this time, Shinano had a list of 30°. As she heeled, water flowed into the open elevator well on her flight deck, sucking many swimming sailors back into the ship as she sank. A large exhaust vent below the flight deck also sucked many other sailors into the ship as she submerged.

At 10:57, Shinano finally capsized and sank stern first at coordinates (33°07′N 137°04′E), 65 miles (105 km) from the nearest land, in about 4,000 m (13,000 ft) of water, taking 1,435 officers, men, and civilians to their deaths. The dead included Abe and both of his navigators, who chose to go down with the ship. Rescued were 55 officers and 993 petty officers and enlisted men, plus 32 civilians for a total of 1,080 survivors. After their rescue, the survivors were isolated on the island of Mitsuko-jima until January 1945 to suppress the news of the carrier's loss. The carrier was formally struck from the Naval Register on 31 August.

US Naval Intelligence did not initially believe Enright's claim to have sunk a carrier. Shinano's construction had not been detected through decoded radio messages or other means, and the American analysts believed that they had located all of Japan's surviving carriers, though a captured Japanese aviator had revealed in July 1943 that a third Yamato-class battleship was being converted into a carrier. Enright was eventually credited with sinking a 28,000-long-ton (28,000 t) Hayatake (Hiyō-class) carrier by the acting commander of the Pacific Fleet's submarine force on the basis of a drawing Enright submitted depicting the ship he had attacked. Once the existence of Shinano was discovered, Enright was credited with her sinking and awarded the Navy Cross.

== Postwar analysis of the sinking ==
Postwar analysis by the U.S. Naval Technical Mission to Japan noted that Shinano had serious design flaws. Specifically, the joint between the waterline armor belt on the upper hull and the antitorpedo bulge on the underwater portion was poorly designed, a trait shared by the Yamato-class battleships; Archerfish's torpedoes all exploded along this joint. The force of the torpedo explosions also dislodged an I-beam in one of the boiler rooms, which punched a hole into another boiler room. In addition, the failure to test for watertightness in each compartment played a role, as potential leaks could not be found and patched before Shinano put to sea. The executive officer blamed the large amount of water that entered the ship on the failure to air-test the compartments for leaks. He reported hearing air rushing through gaps in the watertight doors just minutes after the last torpedo hit—a sign that seawater was rapidly entering the ship, proving the doors were unseaworthy.

== See also ==
- List of ships sunk by submarines by death toll
- Shoki Fukae (Japanese actor known for playing villains in movies and TV show: One of the surviving crew members, he was rescued after drifting for 12 hours after the sinking.)
