= Unrotated Projectile =

Short range anti-aircraft rocket, developed for the Royal Navy

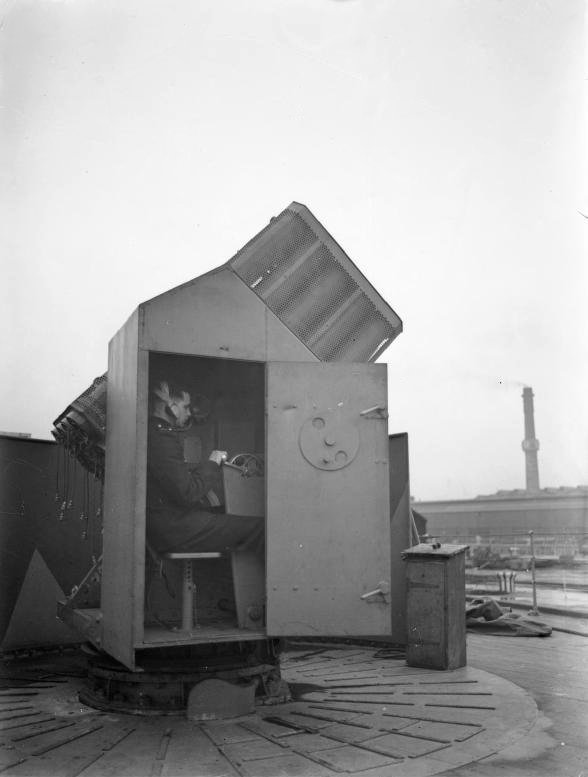
20-barrel 7-inch UP projector on the quarterdeck of the battleship HMS King George V

The Unrotated Projectile (UP) was a British anti-aircraft and ground-bombardment rocket of the Second World War. The original 7-inch version was developed for the Royal Navy by Alwyn Crow of the Projectile Development Establishment of the Ministry of Supply at Fort Halstead. These were generally similar in layout to contemporary mortar bombs. It proved unreliable and ineffective and was withdrawn from use in 1941.

Further development of the concept led to the UP-2 and UP-3, which had diameters of 2-inch and 3-inch respectively and were longer. The UP-3 was used as the basis of the Z Battery anti-aircraft weapons and later developed in air-to-ground form as the RP-3, used against ground forces and shipping by aircraft like the Typhoon and the Beaufighter. In 1944–1945 several adaptations for general bombardment were produced, including Sea Mattress, Land Mattress, LILO and Tulip.

== Development ==
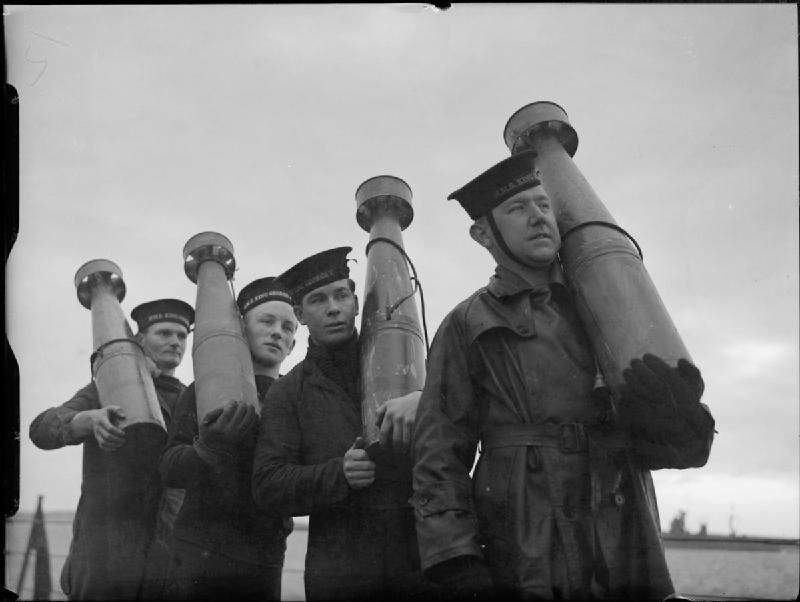
Crew with 7-inch UP projectiles on HMS King George V

Awareness of French and German rocket research in the early 30s coincided with rearmament from 1934. By 1935, the Research Department had set up specialist branches in the Ballistics Directorate and the Explosives Directorate to look into the use of rockets against aircraft. To a lesser extent, the researchers looked into long-range rocketry as a replacement for pilotless aircraft and use as a take-off aid for heavily laden aircraft. The Ballistics Directorate designed components and studied ballistics theory, prediction and stability. The Explosives Directorate worked on a propellant which burnt at a "steady controllable pressure; whose surface, during burning, will remain constant and which will leave, at the end of the burning, as little un-burnt residue as possible". The research threw up more problems; the charges had to be packed in non-inflammable material and a substance had to be developed that was impervious to rapid acceleration and differential gas pressure.

The acceleration of a rocket was far slower than that of projectiles which meant that a new type of fuze, not reliant on acceleration to be armed, was necessary. The cordite propellant had to be formed in unusual shapes which made extrusion a much more elaborate process but by 1936, the Director of Ballistics Research, Alwyn Crow reported that the rockets should be considered as practical weapons of war. A new propellant, solvent-less cordite (Cordite SC) was invented. In July 1936, Crow took over a new Projectile Development Establishment at Fort Halstead which was overseen by the Sub-Committee on Air Defence Research of the Committee of Imperial Defence. In November 1939, Winston Churchill as First Lord of the Admiralty asked Crow urgently to design a means of laying an aerial minefield and to consider other methods of protecting ships against aircraft. Frederick Lindemann, the chief scientific advisor to the government, had previously advocated a scheme for "dropping bombs hanging by wires in the path of attacking aircraft".

In October 1937, the Sub-Committee on Air Defence decided that the 3-inch rocket would take precedence over the 2-inch projectile and that the policy would be to obtain a rocket which, though not ideal, would be a practical weapon. Work on the 2-inch rocket was set aside for the 3-inch version which was comparable to the ammunition fired by the QF 3-inch 20 cwt and QF 3.7-inch anti-aircraft guns against aircraft at medium and high altitudes. By the end of 1938, trials of components were complete (except for the fuze) and proposals for twin and quadruple projectors were solicited from Vickers-Armstrongs. An advantage of a rocket weapon was that it did not need to be produced by traditional armaments firms, except for the novel Cordite SC which would need new facilities at Royal Ordnance Factories. The term unrotated projectile was used as a cover name to disguise the use of a rocket system; the projectile was not spin-stabilised (except for later examples used for land bombardment later in the war).

On 14 November 1939, in his first numbered memo as First Lord of the Admiralty, Winston Churchill, requested weekly reports on the rocket development programme. Churchill wanted plans be made to fit four projectors apiece on five battleships, a pair each onto six cruisers and one on the monitor HMS Erebus under the impression that the rocket armament would make the ships invulnerable to air attack. By April 1940, about forty projectors were ready, firing a container for a parachute, cable and a bomb or a mine, intended to drift into the paths of attacking aircraft. The first operational use of rockets by any country took place in July 1940.

== Variants ==
=== 2-inch rocket ===
2-inch rocket

Service history
- In service: Army
- Used by: Home Guard

Specifications
- Mass: 10.75 lb (4.88 kg)
- Length: 36 in (910 mm)
- Diameter: 2.25 in (57 mm)
- Warhead weight: .56 lb (0.25 kg)
- Propellant: Cordite SC
- Flight ceiling: 10,000 ft (3,000 m)
- Flight altitude: 4,500 ft (1,400 m)
- Maximum speed: 1,500 ft/s (1,000 mph; 1,600 km/h)

The 2-inch rocket was superseded by the 3-inch version but work continued at a reduced tempo. The device contained a stick of Cordite SC with electrical ignition. Fuze 720, a wind-vane armed impact fuze, with a self-destruct timing device set for 4.5 seconds, at an altitude of about 4,500 ft (1,400 m). The rocket was fired after the motor had been ignited for 0.1 second and burned for 1.2 seconds. Without the self-destruct mechanism, the rocket could reach 10,000 ft (3,000 m).

Several launcher types were designed for naval use to defend merchant ships and as a means of illumination but only the Mk II (also known as the Pillar Box mount) was used on land at sites on the south coast. A cabin housed the operator with ten rocket launchers on each side, from which the HE rockets could be fired in salvoes of ten or all at once by the use of foot pedals to trigger electric ignition. The Pillar Box had 360° traverse and elevation of 0° to +85°.

=== 3-inch rocket ===
3-inch rocket

Specifications (Mark 1)
- Mass: 53.97 lb (24.48 kg)
- Length: 76 in (1,900 mm)
- Diameter: 3.25 in (83 mm)
- Effective firing range: 12,200 ft (3,700 m)
- Warhead weight: 4.28 lb (1.94 kg)
- Propellant: 12.7 lb (5.8 kg)
- Flight ceiling: 22,200 ft (6,800 m)
- Maximum speed: 1,500 ft/s (1,000 mph; 1,600 km/h)

The Admiralty was more interested in the rocket concept but the War Office took the view that rockets would be useful for area bombardment and envisaged 285 rocket units with four quadruple launchers apiece and sixty launchers in reserve, which might also allow the QF 3-inch 20 cwt guns to be put in reserve, ready to equip new units raised if war came. The Army waited on trials of the rockets conducted in Jamaica in early 1939, which were judged to be satisfactory and the Sub-Committee on air Defence Research recommended that the 3-inch UP be taken into service. The decision was postponed because the Director of Artillery judged the rocket lacked the accuracy for medium and high altitude fire.

The rocket project languished until the Dunkirk evacuation in June 1940. It was assumed that the rocket lacked the accuracy of gunfire but this assumed that accuracy was necessary. There was a paradox in trying to predict the position of an aircraft in time and space when the direction, height and speed of an aeroplane were inherently unpredictable. It had not been possible to test conventional anti-aircraft fire under wartime conditions, to calculate a statistical norm for the number of shells needed to shoot down a Luftwaffe aircraft. It had been assumed that the 3-inch rocket would have a less stable trajectory and that this would make prediction more difficult; this did not take account of the larger explosive charge carried by the rocket, which needed a much thinner casing than that of a shell and was lethal over a greater volume of space.

The first 3-inch Z Battery was established near Cardiff but the test battery at Aberporth claimed the first German aircraft. Anti-Aircraft Command (AA Command) was allocated 8,000 rocket projectors, of which more than 7,000 were ready by August 1940. Rocket production was well short of the planned output, only 8,400 being provided to AA Command. Priority was awarded to the Admiralty and the quota for AA Command was limited to ten rockets each for 840 projectors.

==== Projector, 3-inch Mk 1 ====
- Rails: 144 in (3,700 mm)
- Weight (approx.): 112 lb (51 kg)
- Height (rails depressed): 88 in (2,200 mm)
- Width: 93.3 in (2,370 mm)
- Elevation: 0°–70°
- Traverse: 360°

The projector was made by the manufacturing firm G. A. Harvey of Greenwich, which delivered a batch of ten projectors less than six weeks after receiving the drawings. By September, the firm had completed 1,000 launchers from the order for 2,500 as the Mark 1 for the Army and 3-inch Harvey L. S. Projector for the Navy, most of which were fitted to merchant ships. The rocket was fired from two rails; aiming was simple, behind a shield the layer on the right hand side pushed the apparatus in the direction of the target using a crude sighting device and the layer on the left locked the launcher before the rocket was fired using electrical ignition. A test battery was set up at Aberporth and other rocket sites were manned by the Home Guard; many of the Mark 1 projectors were used for tests and training.

==== Projector, rocket, 3-inch No.2 Mk 1 ====
- Rails: 144 in (3,700 mm)
- Weight: 1,247 lb (566 kg)
- Height (rails up): 155 in (3,900 mm)
- Width: 107.2 in (2,720 mm)
- Length: 147 in (3,700 mm)
- Elevation: 10°–80°
- Traverse: 360°

The No.2 Mk 1 was the first projector to be mass-produced and could launch two rockets, both from two rails. A hand wheel elevated the projector, traverse was by hand-crank and the rocket motors were launched by electrical ignition from a battery. The base of the launcher was embedded in concrete or mounted on a No. 2 firing platform. A battery of No. 2 projectors was sent to North Africa and used to defend ports.

==== Projector, rocket, 3-inch No.4 Mk 1 and 2 ====
- Rails (long): 144 in (3,700 mm)
- Rails (short): 84 in (2,100 mm)
- Weight: 16,520 lb (7,490 kg)
- Width: 97 in (2,500 mm)
- Length: 280.5 in (7,120 mm)
- Height (travelling): 153 in (3,900 mm)
- Height (rails up): 216 in (5,500 mm)
- Elevation: 7°–75°
- Traverse: 360°

The No.4 projector was designed for mobile use; nine rockets were mounted on 36 rails, two long and two short for each rocket, in vertical banks. The only difference between marks was that the Mk 2 had an electro-magnetic fuze setter. The two operators were housed in two metal cabins, either side of the banks of rockets one traversing and the other elevating the launcher. The rockets could be fired in .75 seconds or in four salvoes of 3, 2, 2 and 2. For movement, the first launchers were carried on an adapted 3-inch anti-aircraft gun platform. The No.2 Mk 1 platform was derived from the Mk 3A 3-inch AA platform, No. 2 Mk 1A was adapted from the Mark 3B platform, No.4 MK 1B rode on the Mk 4A and the Mk 1C was mounted on the Mk IVA platform. A hundred were built, comprising eight batteries, two of which were sent to North Africa.

==== Projector, rocket, 3-inch No.6 Mk 1 ====
- Rails: 143 in (3,600 mm)
- Weight: 15,680 lb (7,110 kg)
- Width: 126 in (3,200 mm)
- Width (cabin): 33 in (840 mm)
- Length (at 20°): 186 in (4,700 mm)
- Length (at 80°): 99 in (2,500 mm)
- Height (at 20°): 156 in (4,000 mm)
- Height (at 80°): 189 in (4,800 mm)
- Elevation: 20°–80°
- Traverse: 345°

The No.6 projector was the largest variant and was another static equipment, going into service in 1944. Twenty rail sets in two banks of ten rail sets, either side of a two-man cabin, fired twenty rockets in .75 seconds or salvoes of 6, 4, 6 and 4. A 7.2-volt battery provided the ignition, operated by a foot-pedal. The elevator sat at the front with a window with simple sights and the traverser sat behind him, also with sights and a window in the cabin roof; both men were in contact with a command post.

=== Projector, rocket, 3-inch, No.8 Mk 1 (Land Mattress) ===
- Length (barrel): 58.25 in (1,480 mm)
- Weight (unloaded): 2,464 lb (1,118 kg)
- Weight (loaded): 4,481.5 lb (2,032.8 kg)
- Length: 127 in (3,200 mm)
- Height (travelling): 69.5 in (1,770 mm)
- Wheel track: 67 in (1,700 mm)
- Elevation: 23°–45°
- Traverse: 20°
- Projectile spin: 660 rpm

Work on a 5-inch artillery rocket was unsatisfactory because of dispersion and short range but the device was adopted by the navy as a shore bombardment weapon. A Landing Craft Tank (Rocket) carried 180 sextuple army launchers (1,080 rockets) with a 3,800 yd (3,500 m) range and known as Mattress. More research showed that a slight rotation increased the accuracy of a fin-stabilised rocket, which was tried with an RP-3 No. 1 rocket motor and a navy 29 lb (13 kg) warhead. Range increased to 8,000 yd (7,300 m) but the Mattress for the Land rocket was limited in elevation from +23° to +45° which restricted the minimum range to 6,700 yd (6,100 m). For shorter-range fire, a spoiler was fitted over the rocket exhaust which could be part-closed, limiting the exhaustion of the gases. Three spoilers were made, which could shorten the range in stages to 3,900 yd (3,600 m). The motor consisted of a cruciform stick of Cordite SC which burned for 1.6 seconds and a new 3-inch warhead was developed but this was not used.

==== Land Mattress projector ====
The first projector had 32 barrels mounted on a 20-cwt General Service trailer and was provided by the Ministry of Supply in May 1944 and another test version had forty barrels. The First Canadian Army showed an interest and after a trial firing in July asked for a battery of twelve projectors. The Mattresses were first used on 1 November during the Battle of the Scheldt (2 October – 8 November 1944) when 1,146 rockets were fired over six hours. The projector was the same as the anti-aircraft apparatus except for the construction methods of some details. Thirty barrels in five rows of six were muzzle-loaded and the rockets were discharged at quarter second intervals, a salvo taking 7.25 seconds. Aiming was by artillery sights, the Dial Sight No.9 and a Sight Clinometer Mk IV; the 50 per cent zone of a salvo at 6,000 yd (5,500 m) was 235 yd × 240 yd (215 m × 219 m) (length and width). The war in Europe was almost over before Tillings Stevens Ltd had built many and some were sent to the Far East. A lighter version for jungle warfare had 16 barrels, weighed 835 lb (379 kg) and could be towed by a Willys MB (quarter ton) jeep but the war ended before it went into service.

==== Projector, Rocket, 3-inch No.10 Mk 1 (LILO) ====
Projector, Rocket, 3-inch No.10 Mk 1

- Length (barrel): 28 in (710 mm)
- Rails: 2.2 in (56 mm)
- Rails (pitch): 1 turn in 48 in (1,200 mm)
- Length (front legs): 25 in (640 mm)
- Weight: 37 lb (17 kg)

Motor, Rocket, 3-inch, No.7 Mk1

- Length (motor): 34.5 in (880 mm)
- Length (21lb shell): 48.75 in (1,238 mm)
- Length (60lb shell): 52 in (1,300 mm)
- Diameter: 3.25 in (83 mm)
- Weight (motor): 18.25 lb (8.28 kg)
- Weight (propellant): 4.25 lb (1.93 kg)

Shell, HE 21lb, No.5 Rocket, 3-inch Mk1

- Length: 14.25 in (362 mm)
- Diameter: 3.25 in (83 mm)
- Weight: 21 lb (9.5 kg)
- Weight (HE filling): 4 lb (1.8 kg)
- Weight (with shell): 39.25 lb (17.80 kg)

Shell, HE 60lb, No.5 Rocket, 3-inch Mk1

- Length: 17.7 in (450 mm)
- Diameter: 6 in (150 mm)
- Weight: 60 lb (27 kg)
- Weight (HE filling): 13.7 lb (6.2 kg)
- Weight (with shell): 78.25 lb (35.49 kg)

To counter elaborately dug-in Japanese troops, a special one-rocket "Projector, Rocket, 3-inch No.10 Mk 1" was designed, under the codename LILO. Two types of rocket were developed using the same No.7 Mk1 motor and either a 21 lb (9.5 kg) HE shell or 60 lb (27 kg) HE shell. Both were very-short-range projectiles, rotated in the launcher barrel to limit dispersion, fired by a 3.4 volt battery. The projector and rocket were designed to be portable by one man each. The front legs were fixed but the rear leg was U-shaped and could be moved back and forth to elevate the front of the barrel; aiming was by open sights at close range. The rockets could penetrate 10 ft (3.0 m) of earth and a layer of logs. The apparatus was so inaccurate that five rockets at 50 yd (46 m)-range were needed for a 95 per cent chance of a hit.

=== RP-3 ===
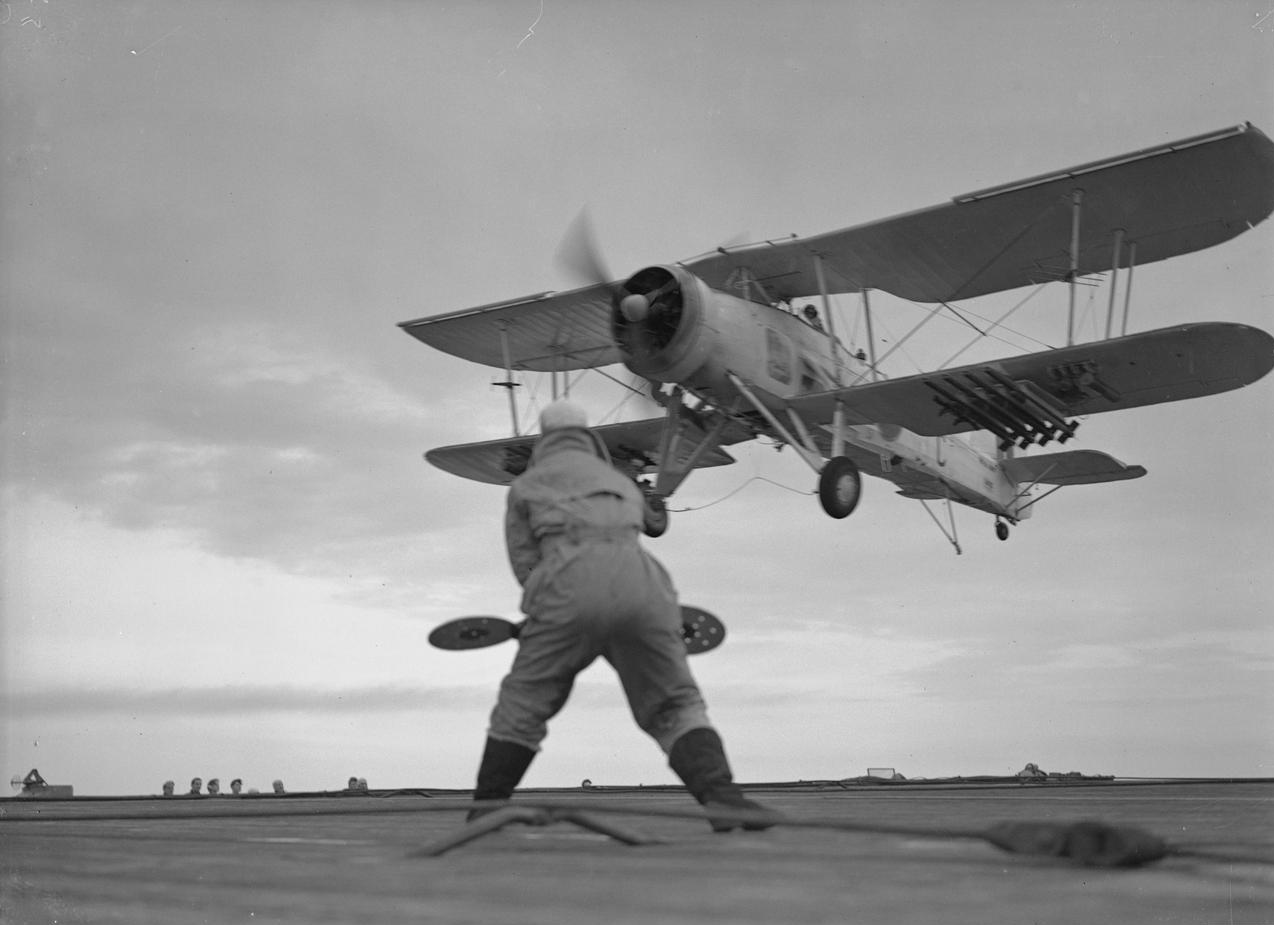
A rocket-armed Swordfish landing on HMS Tracker

The 3-inch UP system was the basis of the RP-3 air-to-surface rocket and the Mattress surface-to-surface multiple rocket launcher. By 1943, Coastal Command decided that RP-3 rockets could be more than a supplement for torpedoes in attacks on merchant ships in the North Sea. The RP-3 was about 6 ft (1.8 m) long and 3 in (76 mm) diameter with 11–12 lb (5.0–5.4 kg) of propellant and 14 lb (6.4 kg) of TNT or Amatol semi-armour piercing warhead, a 25 lb (11 kg) solid armour-piercing projectile or an HE fragmentation warhead with 2.9–12.1 lb (1.3–5.5 kg) of explosive filling. The armour-piercing head was tested against U-boats early in the year. On 23 May 1943 Fairey Swordfish from HMS Archer pierced the pressure hull of U-752 firing Rocket Spears with a cast-iron head. The submarine was scuttled as surface craft arrived.

The explosive rocket was to be tried first on ships. Test firing from a Bristol Beaufighter were conducted in March and April; rails were fitted to Beaufighters of two Coastal Command squadrons and a target ship was moored of North Coates for training. On 22 June 1943, the North Coates Strike Wing used the RP-3 in an attack on an Axis convoy off the Dutch coast between The Hague and Den Helder. The German ships also used a new device, a rocket which lifted a cable-on-a-parachute into the air. The Flak suppression Beaufighter crews claimed to have damaged four Vorpostenboote (Flak ships) with rockets (not upheld by research after the war) and two Beaufighters were shot down.

==== Tulip ====
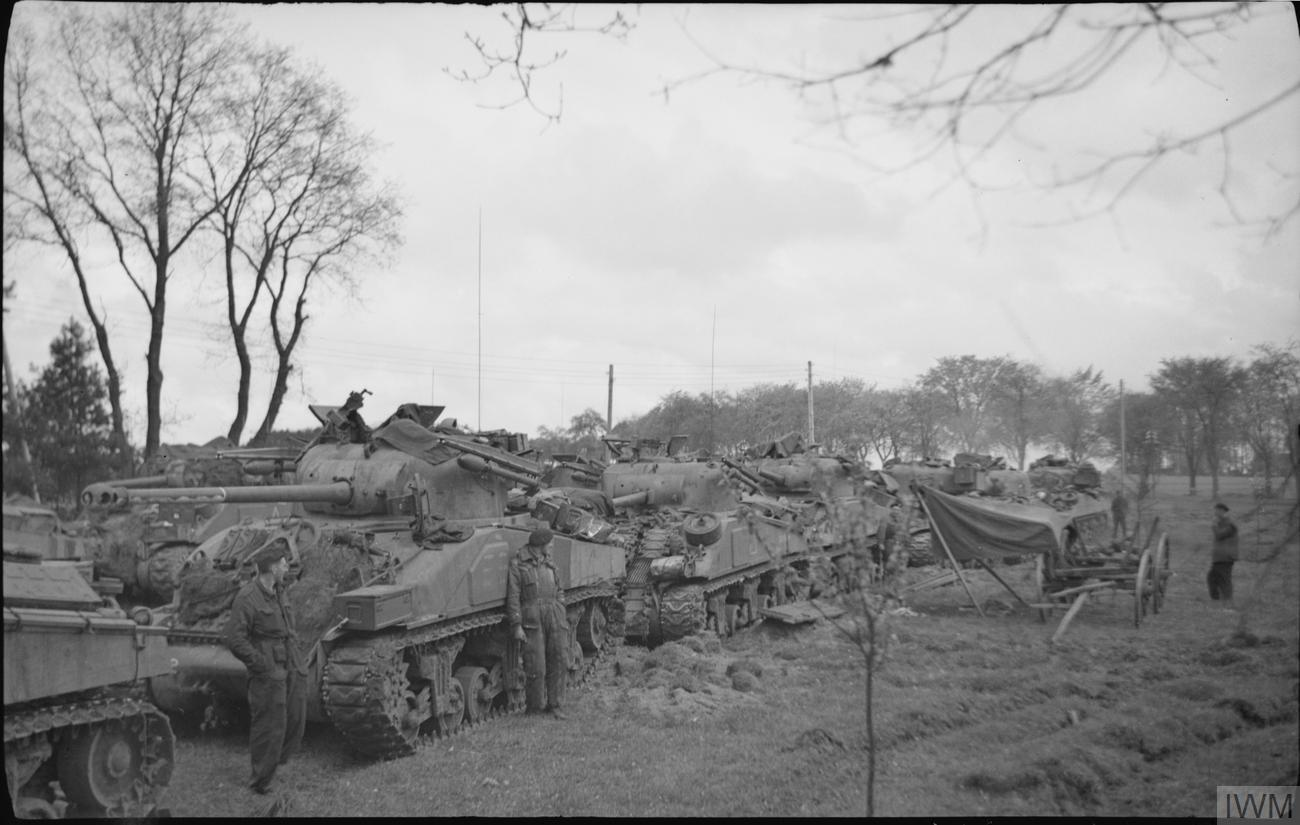
Rocket-armed Sherman tanks of the 1st Battalion Coldstream Guards, 5th Guards Armoured Brigade, 28 April 1945

During 1944, the 1st (Armoured) Battalion Coldstream Guards unit of the Guards Armoured Division obtained some rockets and launch rails from a nearby Typhoon squadron. The Guards mounted one on each side of their tank turrets, the equipment being known as Tulip. The rocket was powered by the "Motor, rocket, aircraft, 3-inch, No.1" but the type launch rail is not known. The rockets carried Shell, HE, 60lb SAP No.1 or No.2 with a 14 lb (6.4 kg) explosive filling. In late March 1945, during the invasion of Germany, an attempt to capture Lingen by coup de main failed and a deliberate attack with artillery support was planned. After an artillery bombardment and under the cover of a smoke screen, No. 2 Troop of the 1st (Armoured) Battalion, Coldstream Guards fired its "Typhoon rockets" and the attack began, an officer ran onto the bridge west of Lingen and cut the wires to a demolition charge, the bridge was captured and charged over by Sherman tanks.

=== 7-inch rocket ===
- Length: 32 in (810 mm)
- Weight: 35 lb (16 kg)
- Horizontal range: 3,000 ft (910 m)
- Sinking speed of mine: 16–23 ft/s (4.9–7.0 m/s)
- Launcher weight: 3.9 long tons; 4.4 short tons (4 t)

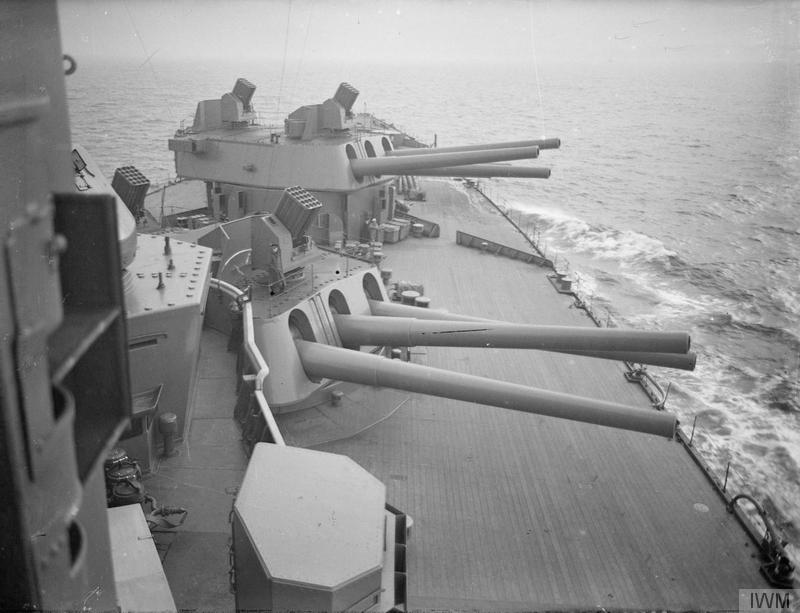
Launchers on the roofs of B and X turrets of HMS Nelson, 1940

The naval weapon had twenty smoothbore tubes and fired ten at a time. A small cordite charge was used to ignite a rocket motor which propelled the fin-stabilised 7 in-diameter (180 mm) rocket out of the tube to a distance of about 1,000 ft (300 m), where it exploded and released an 8.4 oz (240 g) mine attached to three parachutes by 400 ft (120 m) of wire. An aeroplane hitting the wire would draw the mine towards itself, where it would detonate. A high-altitude barrage was developed for an aerial minefield up to 19,000 ft (5,800 m), the fast aerial mine up to 2,000 ft (610 m), with the PE fuse up to 18,000 ft (5,500 m) and the UP up to 20,000 ft (6,100 m). The 7-inch UP was developed simultaneously with the 2-inch and 3-inch UP systems.

A demonstration of the naval rocket containing canisters filled with a parachute, wire and an explosive device to be fired at dive bombers, was laid on for Churchill on HMS Hood, part of the Home Fleet (Admiral Jack Tovey) at Scapa Flow which dramatically exposed a flaw in the concept. Practice rockets were fired and due to an unexpected change of wind, drifted onto the ship and became tangled in the rigging and superstructure. The dummy rounds caused little damage but Tovey was amused at the embarrassment caused to Lindemann and Churchill, keen advocates of the weapon. Five projectors for twenty rockets each were installed on Hood but they misfired twice in action and in one firing managed to burn some sailors in harbour. The report of the Admiralty Board of Enquiry into the sinking of Hood in September 1941 concluded "That the fire that was seen on Hood's boat deck and in which UP and/or 4-inch ammunition was certainly involved, was not the cause of her loss" but it noted that "Action has (already) been taken to land UP mountings and ammunition" in the rest of the fleet. The last ships to carry the 7-inch UP Mk1 were HMS Newcastle and Birmingham.

== Analysis ==
In 2011, David Edgerton wrote that in The Wizard War a chapter in volume II of his wartime memoirs, Winston Churchill defended his interest in anti-aircraft rocket research which had begun in the 1930s. Churchill had promoted anti-aircraft rockets, aerial mines and the photo-electric proximity fuze (PE fuze). Churchill wrote that anti-aircraft guns only became effective towards the end of The Blitz, just as the rockets he championed were coming into service. Edgerton wrote that this meant that they were too late. When Churchill had become Prime Minister in 1940, he had put even more emphasis on rocket development and the PE fuze. The mass production of 3 in (76 mm) anti-aircraft rockets, 5 in (130 mm) chemical rockets, rockets for aerial minefields and other uses cost £14 million. For the production of Cordite SC, ROF Bishopton, a big new factory was built at Bishopton in Scotland and in November 1940 ROF Ranskill was commissioned at Ranskill in Nottinghamshire, which took until 1942 to become operational.

Edgerton called the rocket programme "typically cronyist" in that Major Duncan Sandys MP, Churchill's son in law, was put in charge of an experimental regiment to devise tactics against dive-bombers for rockets and PE fuzes against higher-flying bombers. Sandys was promoted to command the first rocket battery (Z Battery) in south Wales, comprising rocket projectors and a rare gun-laying radar. Z batteries, usually staffed by the Home Guard, were eventually established all over the country. There were many sceptics about the efficacy of rockets and in October 1940, Edward Montagu Campbell Clarke, the Director of Artillery at the Ministry of Supply, wrote that there was "no justification for going to production at the stage of development which this weapon has at present reached, as shown by its trials", which Clarke suspected had been rigged.

In 1966, Archibald Hill wrote in his memoirs that UP was the "dearly beloved pet of Lindemann" and that it was "a most infernal waste of time, effort, manpower and material". Hill thought that the development and introduction costs over two years had been between £30 and £160 million, absorbed 87,000 long tons (88,000 t) of steel and 400 per cent more cordite than would have been needed for the same number of 3.7-inch anti-aircraft shells. Hill called the rockets so inaccurate that "very few of the proximity fuzes would function because there would be no proximity". The PE fuze was "useless"; Edgerton wrote that despite this, more than 100,000 PE fuzes had been manufactured by October 1941. Sandys eventually defied Lindemann, who continued to back the PE fuze. The PE and acoustic fuzes were failures but the third variety, the radio proximity fuze, was a great success later in the war. Edgerton wrote that Harold Macmillan considered that Churchill had been right to persist with rocket weapons and that he had been "proved right in his steady support for the new conceptions" but Edgerton judged the military value of rockets to have been exaggerated. In April and May 1944, there had been a 0.7 chance that a rocket from a salvo of eight would hit something of the size of a tank; despite the inaccuracy of air-to-ground rockets, the fighter-bombers that carried them gained a great reputation.

== See also ==
- Type 4 Incendiary Rocket (RoSa) A Japanese Navy anti-aircraft rocket for ship defence.
- AA mine discharger A Japanese anti-aircraft mortar
- Henschel Hs 297 / 7.3 cm Föhn-Gerät A German anti-aircraft rocket launcher
- Holman Projector Steam-powered anti-aircraft grenade launcher
- Z battery British 3-inch land-based anti-aircraft rocket launcher

== Bibliography ==
- Campbell, John (2002) [1985]. Naval Weapons of World War II (repr. Conway Maritime Press ed.). Annapolis, MD: Naval Institute Press. ISBN 0-87021-459-4.
- Chamberlain, P.; Gander, T. (1975). Mortars and Rockets. WWII Fact Files. New York: Arco. pp. 49–55. ISBN 0-668-03817-9.
- Collier, B. (2004) [1957]. Butler, J. R. M. (ed.). The Defence of the United Kingdom. History of the Second World War United Kingdom Military Series (facs. repr. pbk. Naval & Military Press ed.). London: HMSO. ISBN 978-1-845-74055-9.
- Edgerton, David (2011). Britain's War Machine: Weapons, Resources, and Experts in the Second World War. London: Penguin Books. ISBN 978-0-14-102610-7.
- Furneaux-Smith, F. (1961). The Professor and the Prime Minister: The Official Life of Professor F. A. Lindemann Viscount Cherwell. Boston: Houghton Mifflin. OCLC 254329640.
- Goulter, Christina J. M. (2004) [1995]. Cox, Sebastian (ed.). A Forgotten Offensive: Royal Air Force Coastal Command's Anti-shipping Campaign, 1940–1945. Cass Studies in Air Power (pbk. repr. ed.). London: Frank Cass. ISBN 978-0-7146-4147-8.
- Postan, M. M.; Hay, D.; Scott, J. D. (1964). Hancock, K. (ed.). Design and Development of Weapons: Studies in Government and Industrial Organisation. History of the Second World War, United Kingdom Civil Series. London: HMSO & Longmans, Green & Co. OCLC 681432.
- Parson, L. M. H.; Hill, E. R. (1956). The Story of the Guards Armoured Division. London: Geoffrey Bles. OCLC 899059988.
