= Henschel Hs 297 =

Small German surface-to-air rocket of World War II

7.3 cm Föhn-Gerät
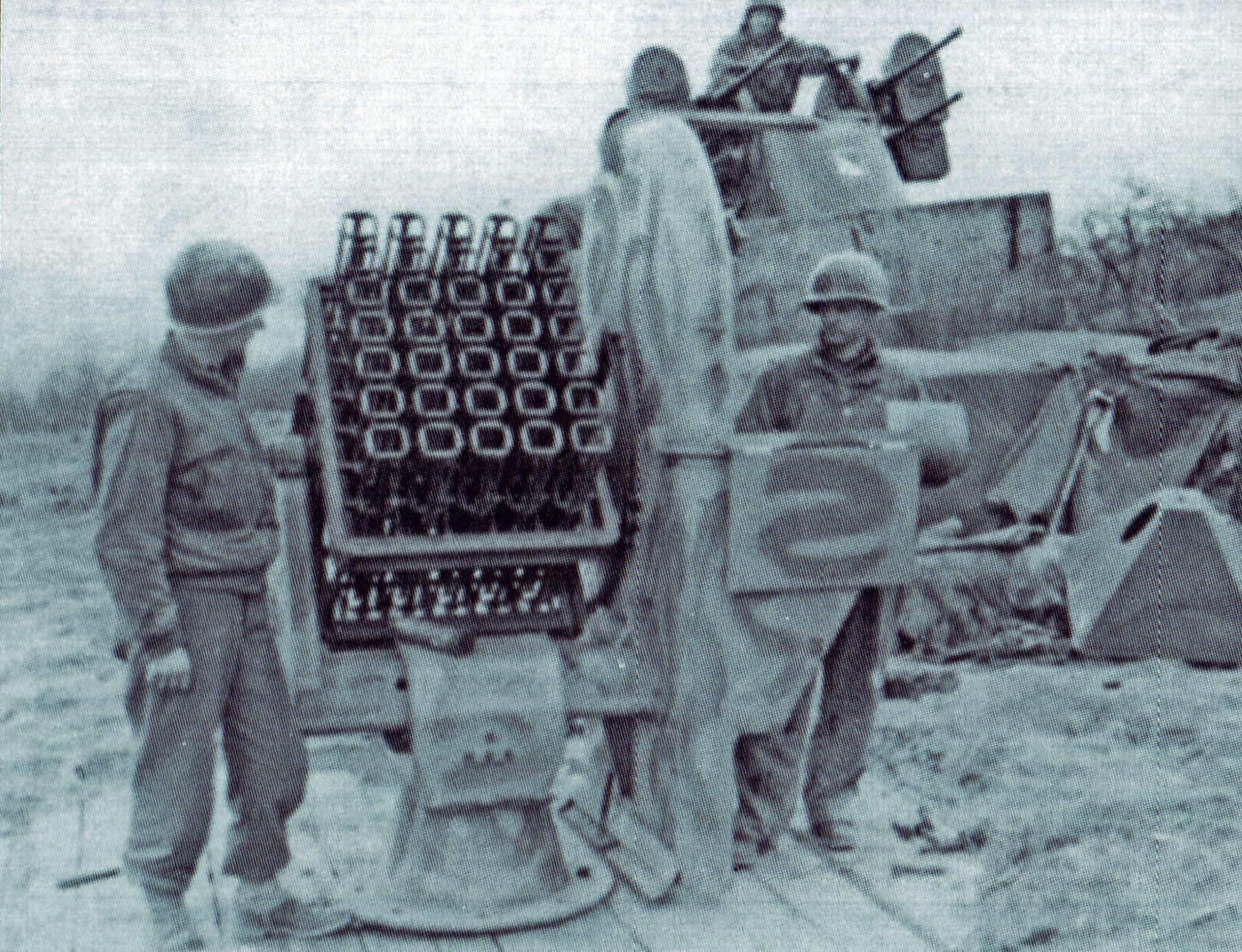
- A Föhn-Gerät rocket projector captured by US troops clearly shows the origin of its occasionally used nickname of "Beercrate flak".
- Type: Anti-aircraft rocket
- Place of origin: Nazi Germany

Service history
- In service: 1943-1945
- Used by: Nazi Germany
- Wars: World War II

Production history
- Designer: Henschel
- Manufacturer: Henschel
- Produced: 1943-1945

Specifications
- Barrel length: .78 m (2 ft 7 in)
- Width: .58 m (1 ft 11 in)
- Height: .81 m (2 ft 8 in)
- Crew: 1
- Shell: 7.3 cm Raketen Sprenggranate
- Shell weight: 2.74 kg (6 lb 1 oz)
- Caliber: 72.9 mm (2.87 in)
- Barrels: 35
- Elevation: Theoretical: -10° to +90° Practical: 0° to +30°
- Traverse: 360°
- Maximum firing range: Vertical: 1.2 km (3,900 ft); Horizontal: 500–751 m (547–821 yd)
- Filling: RDX/TNT/wax
- Filling weight: 280 g (10 oz)

The Henschel Hs 297 Föhn or 7.3 cm Raketen Sprenggranate was a small German surface-to-air rocket of the Second World War. The associated multiple rocket launcher was known as the 7.3 cm Föhn-Gerät.

== Design ==
The Henschel Hs 297 Föhn (The Foehn wind is a warm, dry fall wind) was intended to be used in large barrages to defend targets against low-flying ground attack aircraft. Several launchers were also found at likely river crossing sites at Satzvey, Unkel and Hahn to provide ground fire. The use of dual-purpose sights on the launchers confirms this role.

For mass deployment in the Volkssturm, the launcher was officially termed the Volks-Fla-R-Werfer - an abbreviation of Volkssturm-Flugabwehr-Raketenwerfer ("Volkssturm anti-aircraft rocket launcher"). By February 1945 fifty units were delivered, which were provided to troops for testing. Twenty-four of the launcher racks were assigned to the 3./ FlakLehruVersAbt 900 (o) ("3rd Battery of Anti-Aircraft Training and Testing Battalion 900 (stationary)") in the Remagen area and were used for the first time on 2 March 1945 against Allied fighter-bombers. A few days later, after American forces captured the Ludendorff Bridge at Remagen, some of the launchers (classified as secret) fell intact into the hands of the Americans.

The specimens found were either emplaced statically, with the pedestal bolted to a foundation or were mounted on a circular folding platform which was carried on a two-wheeled trailer. The projector could be fired from the trailer, but its traverse was limited. To achieve full 360° of traverse it was necessary to remove the launcher from the trailer, support it on the jacks, then unfold the circular platform and fasten the pedestal to the foundation. The elevation scale was marked from -10° to +90° but the launchers that were evaluated post-war could not be depressed below 0° or elevated above +30°. An elevating hand-wheel controlled both the launch rack and sight with the two moving in unison. The launcher could also be locked in both traverse and elevation. Two styles of sights were provided; the main sight was a pivoting-ring type that was graduated for both ground and anti-aircraft targets. While the secondary sight was an open sight with a rear V notch and triangular front post sight. The range limits were 500–1,200 m (1,600–3,900 ft) for anti-aircraft use or 500–751 m (547–821 yd) for ground fire.

The launcher consisted of a square framework holding 35 launch racks, a pedestal mount with a shielded operators station, plus traverse and elevation mechanisms. The launch racks were supported on pipes which run both horizontally and vertically and are fitted to a metal framework trunnioned to two vertical arms extending upwards from the pedestal base. Each launch rack was provided with a firing pin for a percussion cap which ignited its rocket. A single cocking handle on the left-rear of the launcher cocked all 35 firing pins and all rockets were launched at the same with no provision for single fire. Two safety devices were provided; the first was a button on the trigger handle which had to be released before the weapon could be fired, the second was a safety lever on the rear of the racks which when set to safe caused a metal surface to block the trigger linkage.

== Rockets ==
The Raketen Sprenggranate was a 72.9 mm (2.87 in) spin-stabilized rocket with a length of 28 cm (11 in) and a weight of 2.74 kg (6 lb 1 oz). The projectile was similar to the 7.3 cm Propagandawerfer 41 but instead of being filled with propaganda leaflets the Raketen Sprenggranate had an explosive warhead with dual fuzes. The first fuze was a nose-mounted percussion fuze that would explode on contact with a target while the secondary fuze was a time-delayed base fuze that was initiated during ignition of the rocket motor. When the fuze burnt out it would flash through an orifice in the base of the warhead which would detonate the main charge. The warhead for the rocket was ogival in shape and was threaded internally to receive the rocket motor. The explosive filling was a preformed charge of 280 g (10 oz) of RDX/TNT/wax pressed in a block and wrapped in wax paper.

The rocket motor consisted of a cylindrical body and a cup-shaped base plate. The body was screwed into the warhead at the forward end and into the base plate at the rear. The body contained a single stick of solid fuel propellant which was ignited by a percussion cap which fit in a pocket drilled in the center of the base plate. Exhaust gasses were forced through seven straight inner venturis and seven angled outer venturis which imparted spin.

In addition to its anti-aircraft and surface to surface roles the Raketen Sprenggranate also armed the Bachem Ba 349 Natter manned vertical take-off rocket interceptor. Twenty-four rockets were housed in the Ba 349's nose-cone. The Ba 349 was not operational before the end of the war, though the rocket weapon system was extensively ground-tested.

== See also ==
- Unrotated projectile - A British anti-aircraft rocket system.
- Z Battery - A British anti-aircraft rocket system.

== Photo gallery ==
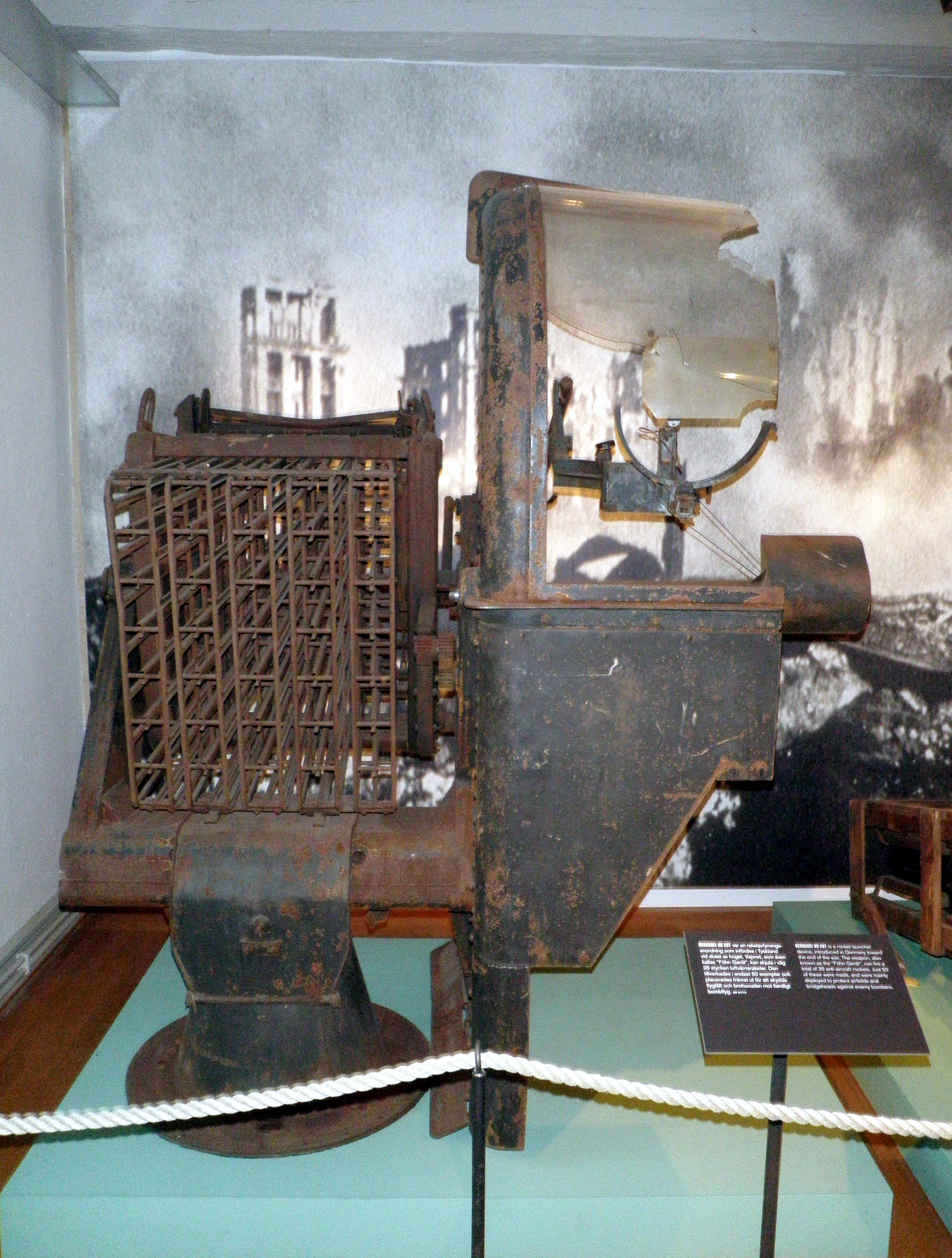
Henschel Hs 297 on display at the Swedish Army Museum in Stockholm, Sweden

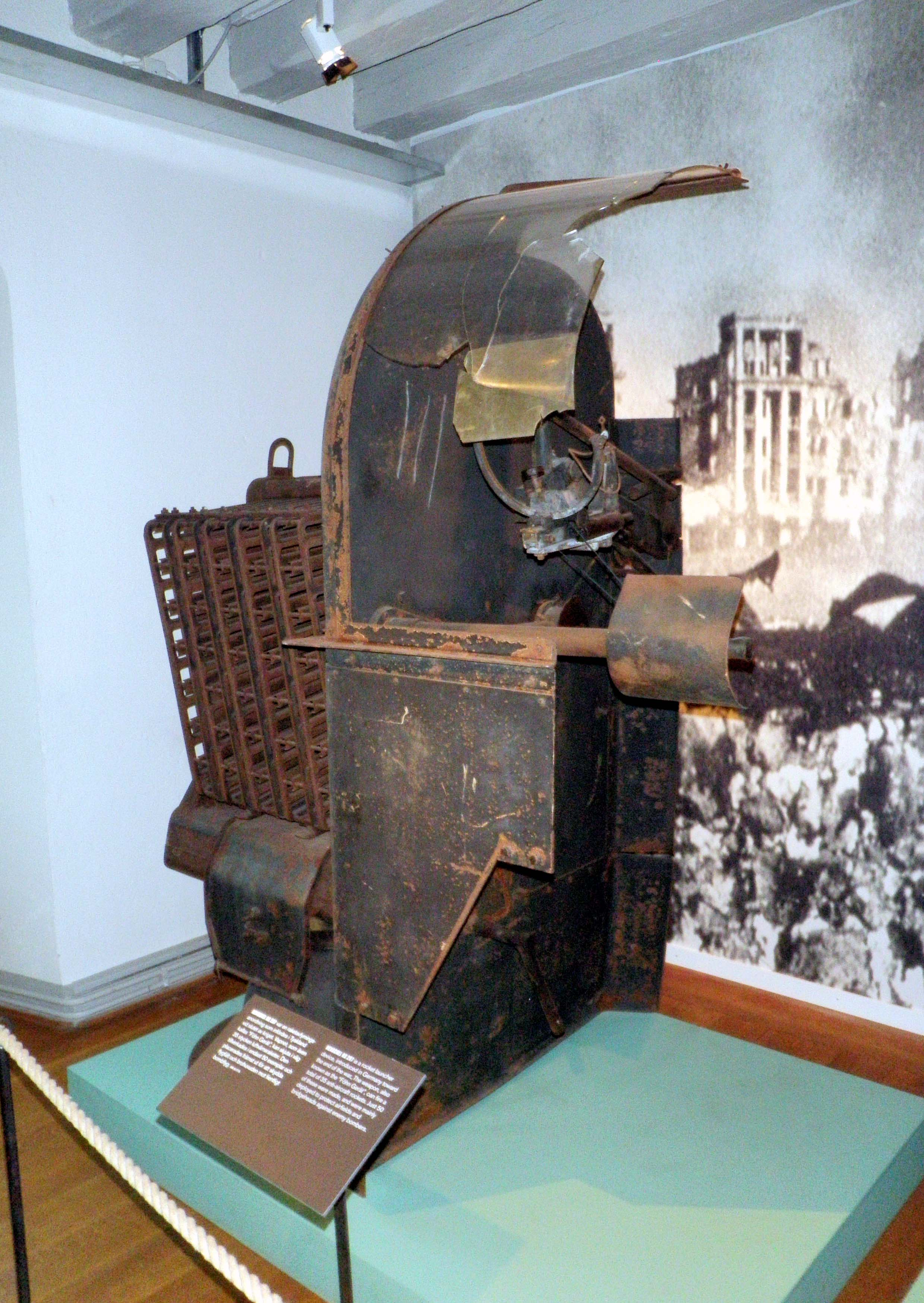
Side-view of the rocket launcher

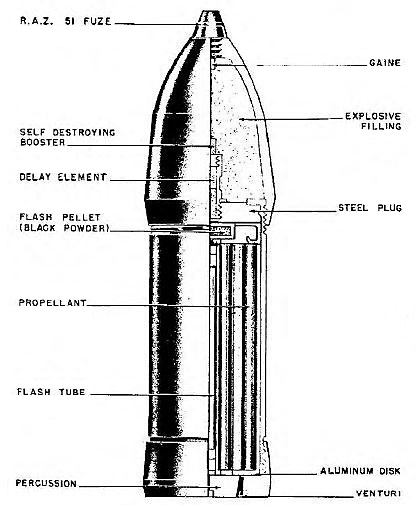
7.3 cm Raketen Sprenggranate

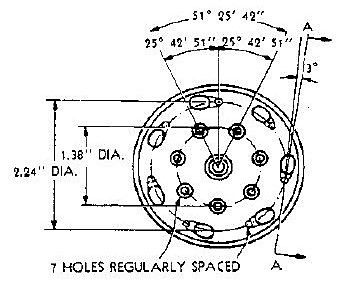
7.3-cm Raketen Sprenggranate baseplate

== Bibliography ==
- Bruene, Lothar, and Weiler, Jacob, Remagen in March 1945 - A documentary on the final phase of the World War II, Peace Museum Bridge at Remagen e. V. (ed.), Remagen, 1993. ISBN 3-9803385-9-2
- Fritz Hahn: Waffen und Geheimwaffen des deutschen Heeres 1933–1945. Bernhard & Graefe Verlag, 3. Auflage/Sonderausgabe in einem Band, Bonn 1998, ISBN 3-7637-5915-8, S. 209.
- Oberkommando der Luftwaffe – General der Flakwaffe: Merkblatt g. 251. Richtlinien für Einsatz und Kampfführung der Flakartillerie in der Luftverteidigung. Teil C, Heft 25: Schutz von Wasserkunstbauten vom 10. September 1944, Seite 12–13 und Seite 18. GermanDocsInRussia.org
