= Type 11 70 mm infantry mortar =

Type 11 70 mm mortar
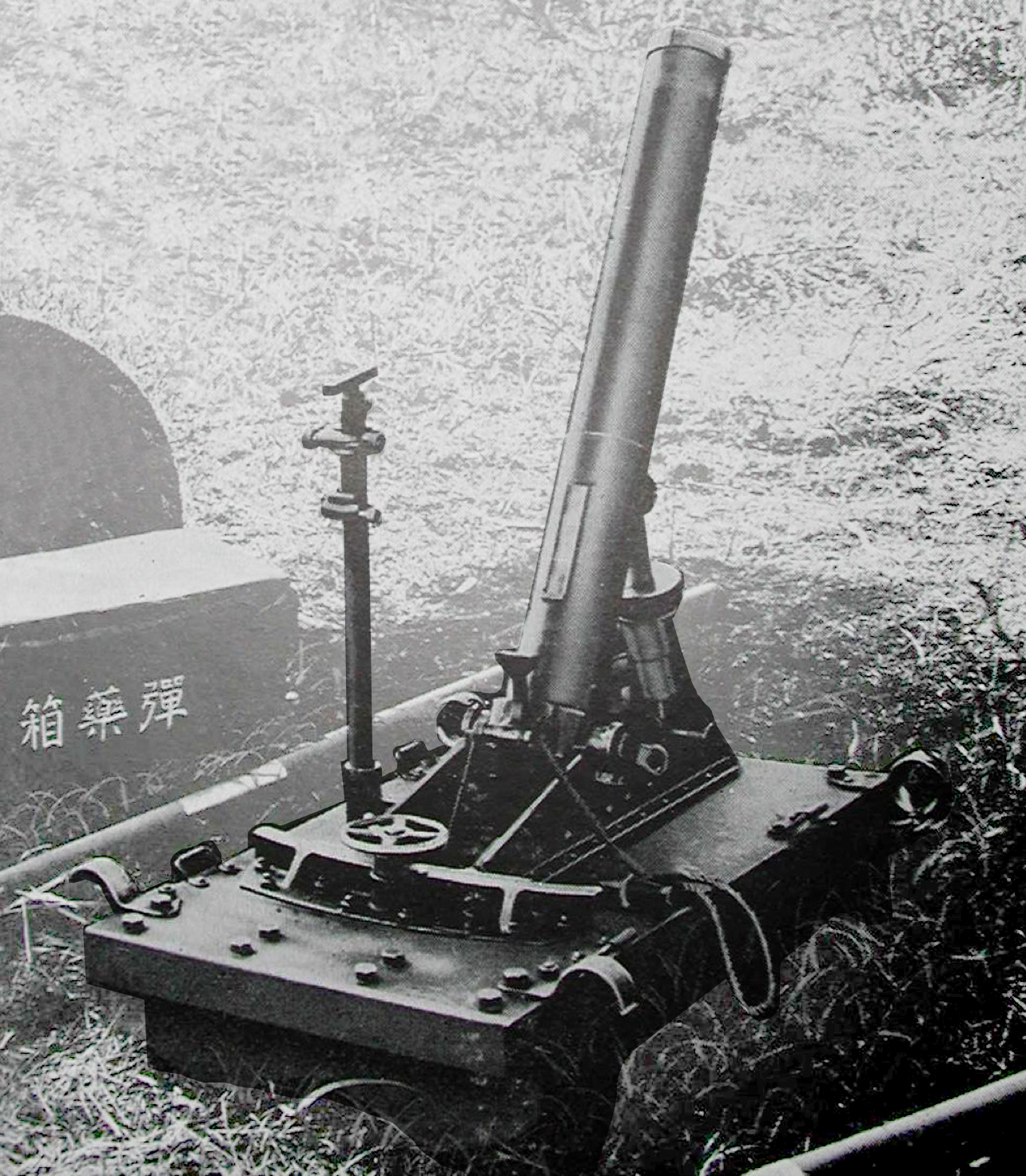
- Japanese Type 11 70 mm mortar
- Type: Infantry mortar
- Place of origin: Empire of Japan

Service history
- In service: 1922
- Used by: Imperial Japanese Army
- Wars: Second Sino-Japanese War, World War II

Production history
- No. built: 234

Specifications
- Mass: 60.7 kg (134 lb)
- Length: 75 cm (2 ft 6 in)
- Crew: 10
- Shell weight: 2.1 kg (4 lb 10 oz)
- Caliber: 70 mm (2.8 in)
- Elevation: +37° to +77°
- Traverse: 23°
- Muzzle velocity: 147 m/s (480 ft/s)
- Effective firing range: 1.5 km (0.93 mi)

The Type 11 70 mm infantry mortar, was a muzzle-loading, rifled bore infantry mortar used by the Japanese. The Type 11 designation was given to this gun as it was accepted in the 11th year of Emperor Taishō's reign (1922). It was first used in 1922 and was the first mortar to be introduced by the Imperial Japanese Army. The Type 11 was later replaced by the Type 92 battalion gun.

== Design ==
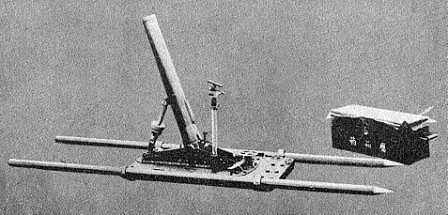
Type 11 infantry mortar with carrying handles

The Model 11 (1922) 70 mm mortar is exceptional among Japanese mortars in that, although a muzzle-loading weapon, it has a rifled bore. The Japanese marking is "11th year model high-angle infantry gun". A monopod, similar to the support of the US 4.2-inch chemical mortar, is another distinguishing feature. The total weight of the weapon is 133.75 lb (60.7 kg), of which 99.5 lb (45.1 kg) represents the weight of the base plate. The traverse of the piece is 410 mils (23 degrees), and its elevation is 661 to 1,370 mils (37 to 77 degrees). A gunner's quadrant is used to lay in the weapon. It has a level vial, actuated by a knob, a movable arm, and a fixed elevation scale. The elevation scale is graduated in half-degree units from 0 to 55 degrees. The movable arm has a vernier scale which permits readings of 1/16th degree. Before the weapon can be fired, by means of a lanyard attached to a striker arm, a latch pin on the breech end of the tube must be set in its recess.

== Ammunition ==
The complete high explosive (HE) round consists of a fuze, the shell body, and the propellant charge assembly. The fuze is a point-detonating type, consisting of a two-piece brass body, a booster cup, a detonator holder, and a washer. The steel shell body is threaded at the top to receive the fuze assembly, and at the bottom to accommodate the propellant charge assembly. It is marked with a white band near the base, indicating the body of the shell is made of high grade steel and a red band at the nose, indicating it is filled with black powder. The propellant charge assembly consists of the percussion cap, the propellant powder, and an expanding copper rotating band. The propellant charge is ignited when the firing pin hits the percussion cap. The propellant gases expand the copper rotating band against the rifling in the interior of the barrel; the rifling causes the projectile to rotate and thus increases the accuracy of its flight. The projectile is 8.62 inches (218.9 mm) long and 2.18 inches (55.4 mm) inches in diameter; the complete round weighs 4 pounds 10.8 ounces (2.12 kg). The 70mm mortar was also used to launch an unusual AA mine discharger shell.

== Bibliography ==
- US War Department Special Series No. 19 Japanese Infantry Weapons December 1943
- US War Department Special Series No 30 Japanese Mortars and Grenade Dischargers 1945
- US War Department TM-E 30-480 Handbook on Japanese Military Forces 1 October 1944
- US Navy Bomb Disposal School Japanese Ammunition 1 July 1945
