= Fort Halstead =

British military research site

Coordinates: 51°18′42″N 0°08′58″E

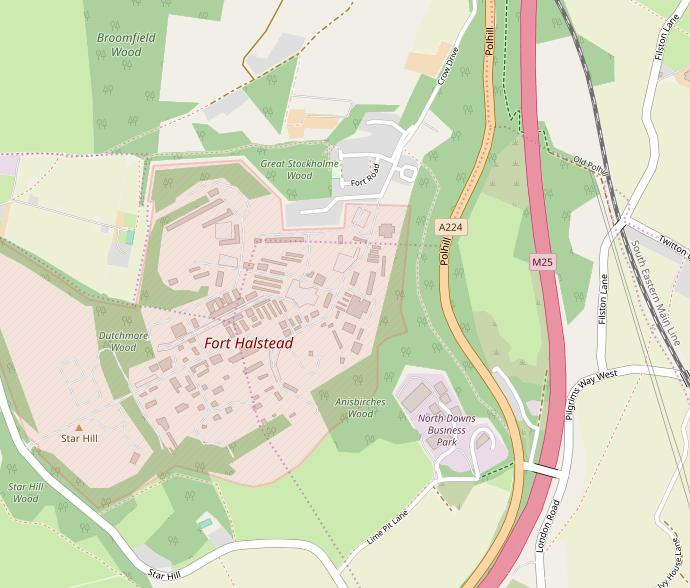
Map of the area of Kent north of the town of Sevenoaks showing Fort Halstead

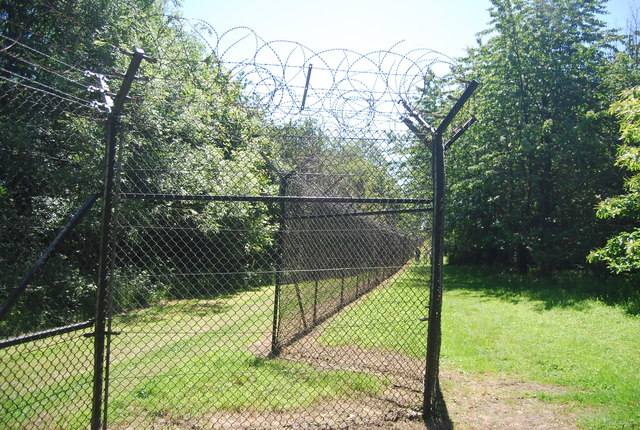
Fort Halstead former MOD establishment in Kent UK, viewed in 2011. At intervals there is a projection in the fence line, this is to allow those guards inside to get a better view along the outside of the fence.

Fort Halstead was a research site of the Defence Science and Technology Laboratory (Dstl), an executive agency of the UK Ministry of Defence. It is situated on the crest of the Kentish North Downs, overlooking the town of Sevenoaks, southeast of London. Originally constructed in 1892 as part of a ring of fortresses around London, Fort Halstead was to be staffed by volunteers in the event of a crisis.

The base became home to the Projectile Development Establishment, the Ministry of Supply and later was the headquarters of the Royal Armament Research and Development Establishment (RARDE).

== Design and construction ==
Fort Halstead formed a part of the London Defence Positions, a scheme devised by Lieutenant General Sir Edward Bruce Hamley and implemented by the Secretary of State for War, Edward Stanhope, who announced the plan to Parliament in 1889. The scheme envisaged a line of entrenchments which would be dug in the event of war to protect the southern and eastern approaches to the capital. Supporting these were to be thirteen simple forts, known as "Mobilisation Centres", which would contain the tools, stores and ammunition for the men of the Volunteer Force, who were tasked with digging the entrenchments and manning them against any invaders.

Putting these plans into action in 1890, the War Office purchased land at Halstead, Kent, on high ground near the town of Sevenoaks. Delayed by a shortage of funds, the polygonal fort was constructed between 1895 and 1897; it featured vaulted barrack casemates on the west side and a magazine on the east. An earthen rampart with positions for light field artillery pieces and machine guns was surrounded by a ditch with a concrete revetment on the scarp face. A cottage was built for a caretaker, who was responsible for maintenance and security in peacetime.

== History as a defensive work ==
The growing superiority of the Royal Navy, and the signing of the Entente Cordiale with France, resulted in the reduced likelihood of an invasion and the London Defence Scheme was officially abandoned in March 1906. Many of the Mobilisation Centres were quickly sold; however, Fort Halstead and a few others were retained, perhaps to facilitate the dispersal of the stores removed from the other sites. After the outbreak of the First World War, the London Defence Scheme was revived and many of the planned entrenchments were actually dug to form an inland stop line.

Fort Halstead seems to have reverted to its intended role at this time; in 1915, a laboratory was built inside the fort for the inspection of ammunition. In 1921, the fort was sold to a retired colonel, who took up residence in the laboratory and let out the cottages. The rest of the site was used as a campsite for the Territorial Army, Boy Scouts, Girl Guides, and accommodation of refugees.

== Rocket research ==
In 1938, Fort Halstead became the home of the Projectile Development Establishment, which was continuing work on solid fuelled rockets that had started at Royal Arsenal in Woolwich two years earlier. Under the direction of Alwyn Crow, work was mainly on rockets that could be used as anti-aircraft weapons. In connection with this research, over eighty new buildings were constructed in and around the fort.

The work at Halstead resulted in the 7-inch Unrotated Projectile used on ships of the Royal Navy, and a 3-inch version that was operated by the British Army in hundreds of Z Batteries for the air defence of the United Kingdom. Further developments were the RP-3 air-to-surface anti-tank rocket and the Mattress and Land Mattress surface-to-surface bombardment systems.

In 1940, Fort Halstead became vulnerable to enemy action and Germans knew about the rocket development there, so Projectile Development Establishment was evacuated to RAE Aberporth.

== History of RARDE ==
Two departments, the "Research Department" and the "Design Department", were established in 1922 at Woolwich Arsenal. During the Second World War, the Design Department moved to Fort Halstead, followed by the Research Department. It is believed that Britain's development of the atomic bomb, hidden under the name 'High Explosive Research' (HER) was initially based at Fort Halstead, where the first atomic bomb was developed under the directorship of William George Penney, who had been appointed Chief Superintendent Armament Research ("CSAR", called "Caesar") by C. P. Snow. Operation Hurricane saw the bomb conveyed by frigate to Australia and successfully exploded in the Montebello Islands. In 1950, it is thought that the 'HER' research was moved to a new site at the Atomic Weapons Establishment, Aldermaston in Berkshire.

In 1955, the two departments were merged to give the Armament Research and Development Establishment (ARDE), which was granted the title "Royal" in February 1962. In the 1980s, RARDE was amalgamated with the Military Vehicles and Engineering Establishment (MVEE) – formerly the Fighting Vehicles Research and Development Establishment (FVRDE) – with sites at Chertsey and Christchurch, and the Propellants, Explosives and Rocket Motor Establishment based at Waltham Abbey and Westcott.

Following the December 1988 Lockerbie bombing, forensic experts from RARDE's explosives laboratory examined material recovered from the crash scene, and subsequently testified as expert witnesses at the Pan Am Flight 103 bombing trial.

In 1996, the bus from the Aldwych bus bombing was taken to Fort Halstead for analysis, where previously a number of Irish Republican Army (IRA) explosive devices had been examined.

RARDE was home to a number of military simulation and war game projects, mainly aimed as assessing the effectiveness of future defence equipment procurement. After Iraq's invasion of Kuwait and throughout the latter half of 1990, a series of computerised war games were conducted at RARDE in preparation for Operation Granby, Britain's contribution to the Gulf War.

In 2017, scientists from the Forensic Explosives Laboratory at Fort Halstead examined the wreckage of the aircraft from the crash of a Polish Air Force Tu-154 in 2010, for traces of explosives, after being engaged by the Polish government.

== Evolution to DERA ==
On 1 April 1991, the Defence Research Agency (DRA) was set up by bringing together Royal Aerospace Establishment (RAE), Admiralty Research Establishment (ARE), RARDE, and the Royal Signals and Radar Establishment (RSRE). It was an executive Agency of the Ministry of Defence. Four years later, when DRA was itself merged to form the Defence Evaluation and Research Agency (DERA), the forensic explosives laboratory came under media and scientific scrutiny. In 1996, amid allegations that contaminated equipment had been used in the testing of forensic evidence, an inquiry was set up under Professor Brian Caddy of Strathclyde University to investigate the laboratory's alleged shortcomings.

== Dstl and QinetiQ ==
Following the split of DERA in 2001 into QinetiQ and Dstl, the Fort Halstead site was retained by QinetiQ who leased part of it back to Dstl. Its most recent principal functions have been research, test, evaluation and forensic analysis into explosives, and the site's explosives laboratory was again used in the investigation following the attempted 21 July 2005 London bombings. The facility has been the largest employer in the Sevenoaks district, with 1,300 personnel working on the site in 2000.

In March 2006, QinetiQ sold the Fort Halstead site to Armstrong Kent LLP for an undisclosed sum, remaining on-site as a tenant. In June 2011, Dstl announced that its facilities at Fort Halstead were to close following a review of operations at the site, although delays in building new facilities at Porton Down has meant Dstl finally left in October 2022 (taking eleven rather than the planned five years).

In 2017, Armstrong Kent sold the site to Merseyside Pension Fund. In 2023 Sevenoaks District Council granted permission for 635 houses on the site.

== Distinguished former staff ==
- Richard, Baron Beeching, "Dr Beeching", author of the report The Reshaping of British Railways
- Sir Alwyn Crow, developer of the Unrotated Projectile
- Sir Frank Ewart Smith
- Douglas Hartree, after whom the Hartree unit of atomic energy is named, and the Hartree–Fock method of approximating n-body wavefunctions
- Sir John Lennard-Jones, devisor of the Lennard-Jones potential description of atomic attraction
- J.W. Maccoll, of Taylor-Maccoll theory of supersonic flow over a cone
- Sir Nevill Mott, Nobel Laureate in Physics
- William, Baron Penney of East Hendred, a principal scientist on the Manhattan Project, and leader of Britain's High Explosive Research project
- Dick Strawbridge, engineer, environmentalist and broadcaster

== See also ==
- Investigation into the bombing of Pan Am Flight 103
- Blue Peacock nuclear land mine
- UK nuclear weapons development
- Atomic Energy Research Establishment (AERE or the Harwell Laboratory)
- Atomic Weapons Research Establishment (AWRE)
