= AA mine discharger =

Japanese WWII anti-aircraft weapon

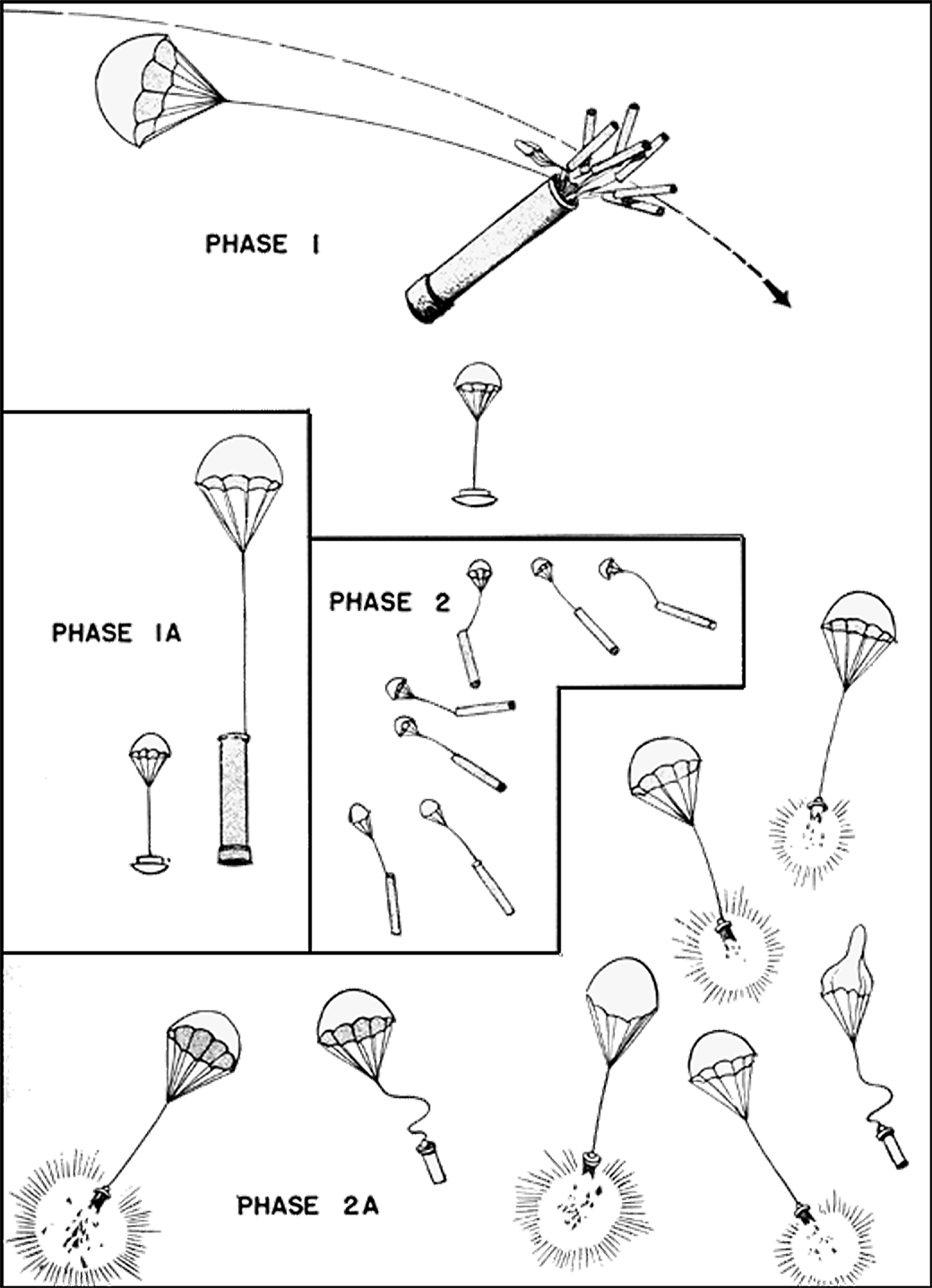
Parachute mines deploying

The AA mine discharger was a Japanese anti-aircraft weapon of the Second World War. The device was a simple tube like an infantry mortar of 70 mm (2.8 in) or 81 mm (3.2 in) caliber. Instead of a standard mortar bomb, the projectile was a tube containing seven individual mines, each approximately 11/16ths of an inch in diameter (18 mm) and 3 inches (76 mm) long. Each mine was equipped with its own parachute. When fired, the mortar threw the shell to a range of 3,000 to 4,000 feet (900 to 1,200 m) and a maximum altitude of approximately 600 m (2,000 ft). The shell ejected the mines at the top of its arc. They would then float down on their parachutes. They were fused to detonate on contact or after a fixed time period, damaging nearby aircraft. The projectile could alternatively be launched using a standard Type 11 70 mm infantry mortar.

The weapon could also be used like a simple cluster bomb, by firing over enemy troops.

== See also ==
- Unrotated projectile a British rocket launched parachute aerial mine system for ship defence.
- Type 4 Incendiary Rocket (RoSa), a Navy anti-aircraft rocket for ship defence.
