= 7.3 cm Propagandawerfer 41 =

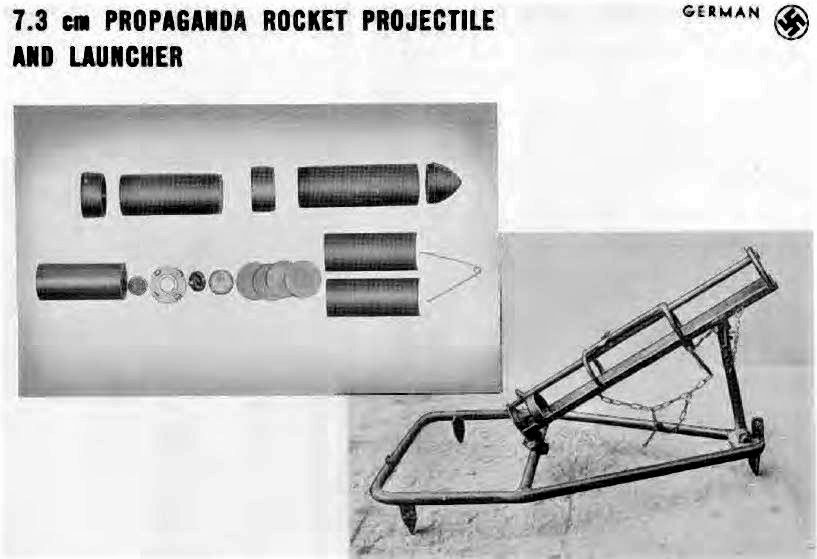
- Type: Rocket artillery
- Place of origin: Nazi Germany

Service history
- In service: 1941-1945
- Used by: Nazi Germany
- Wars: World War II

Specifications
- Mass: 12.26 kg (27 lb)
- Barrel length: .75 m (2 ft 6 in)
- Width: .5 m (1 ft 8 in)
- Shell: .4 m (1 ft 4 in)
- Shell weight: 3.24 kg (7 lb 2 oz)
- Caliber: 72.4 mm (2.85 in)
- Elevation: +45° fixed
- Muzzle velocity: 250 m/s (820 ft/s)
- Effective firing range: 3.4 km (2 mi)
- Filling: Leaflets
- Filling weight: .23 kg (8 oz)

The Propagandawerfer 41 was a rocket launcher for the associated non-lethal Propagandagranate 41 rocket. The launcher and rocket were a light man-portable system fired by specially-trained propaganda troops during World War II to distribute leaflets.

== Description ==
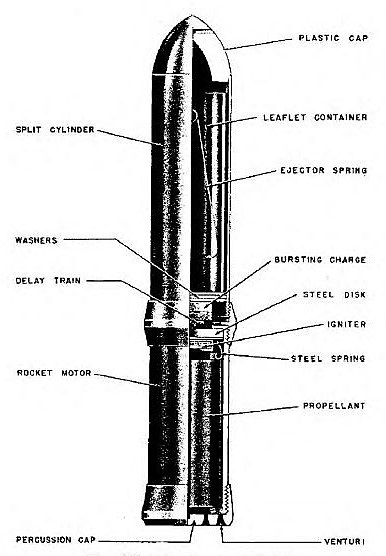
7.3 cm Propagandagrante 41

=== Launcher ===
The Propagandawerfer 41 consisted of a light 12.26 kg (27 lb) steel tube framework. The base of the launcher was triangular in shape and had a crossbar through the center with a hinge that connected the base to a circular launch cage. At the tip of the base there was an adjustable arm for elevating the launch cage and in the center of the launch cage was a trough which the Propagandagranate 41 rocket was launched from. The rocket rested at the top of the cage until the crew pulled a lanyard, the rocket then slid down until it hit a firing pin which launched the rocket.

=== Rocket ===
The Propagandagranate 41 was constructed of a plastic nose cone which held 200 leaflets weighing .23 kg (8 oz) that were rolled around a coiled spring and a metallic base which held the solid rocket. When the rocket was fired propellant gasses were forced through a steel base plate that had angled venturi drilled in it to impart spin. A delay fuse was also ignited and a bursting charge separated the nose cone from the base at an altitude of 100–150 m (330–490 ft), the spring then uncoiled to scatter the leaflets.
