= Type 4 Incendiary Rocket (RoSa) =

Imperial Japanese Anti-Aircraft weapon

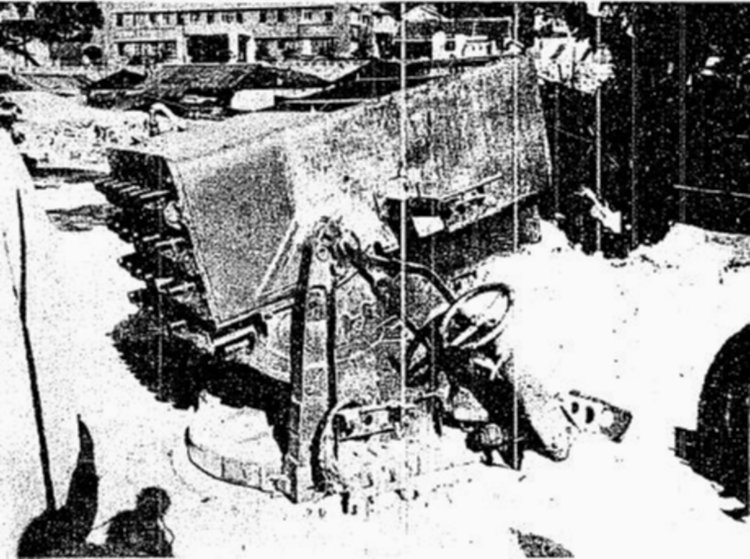
- A 28 tubes rocket launcher
- Type: anti-aircraft rocket
- Place of origin: Japan

Service history
- In service: 1944–1945
- Used by: Imperial Japanese Navy
- Wars: Second World War

Production history
- Designed: 1943
- Produced: 1944–1945

Specifications
- Mass: 24 kg (53 lb)
- Length: 73 cm (29 in)
- Diameter: 12 cm (4.7 in)
- Warhead: 24 incendiary charges
- Detonation mechanism: Time fuze
- Engine: 6 solid propellant rockets
- Propellant: "Special DT6" (solid powder)
- Operational range: 4,800 m (5,200 yd)
- Maximum speed: 720 km/h (450 mph)
- Launch platform: 12 cm, 28 tubes rocket launcher Aircraft carrier, battleship

The Roketto Yon-shiki Shō-san-dan (ロケット四式焼霰弾, "type 4 incendiary rocket"), sometimes just RoSa-dan (ロサ弾, "incendiary rocket", abbreviation of the name) were anti-aircraft rockets used by the Imperial Japanese Navy during the World War II, combining incendiary shrapnel elements.

The rocket is designated with the English borrowing "rocketto", but stays more commonly classified as a "shell" (弾, "dan"), borrowing partially the technology used by the Type 3 anti-aircraft shell "San Shiki".

The Imperial Japanese Navy deployed the 12 Senchi 28 Rensō Funshinhō (十二糎二八連装噴進砲, "12 cm, 28 tubes rocket launcher"), a specially built rocket launcher, on a number of aircraft carriers and battleships during 1944–1945, with the type first seeing action in October 1944. It was also emplaced at Kure Navy Yard to provide anti-aircraft coverage. This rocket launcher used the 25 mm triple AA mount with minor modifications.

The rockets were intended to put up a barrage of flame, by being notably equipped on a 28 rack rocket-launcher, through which any aircraft attempting to attack would have to navigate. However, much like the sanshiki shells, these rockets were not very effective, lacking in effect radius among other things.

An experimental 12 cm (4.7 in) 1.6 kg (3.5 lb) explosive warhead variant for use in the conventional artillery role was developed but is believed to have never entered formal service. The Imperial Japanese Navy also attached a small number of 12 cm AA rockets to suicide boats in 1945 to act as a type of visual distraction against potential targets during an invasion scenario. One rocket was attached to each side of the boat.

== Specifications ==
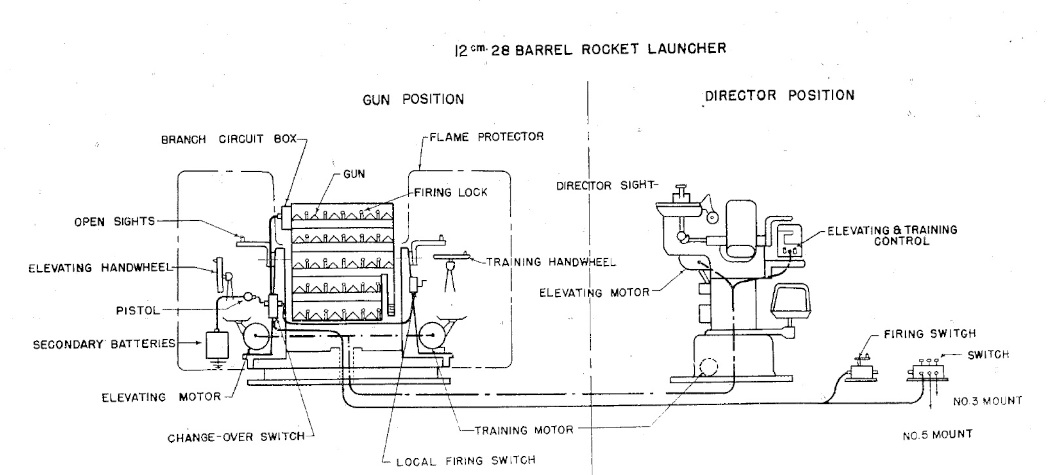
Diagram of the connections between the launcher and the type 94 fire control system.

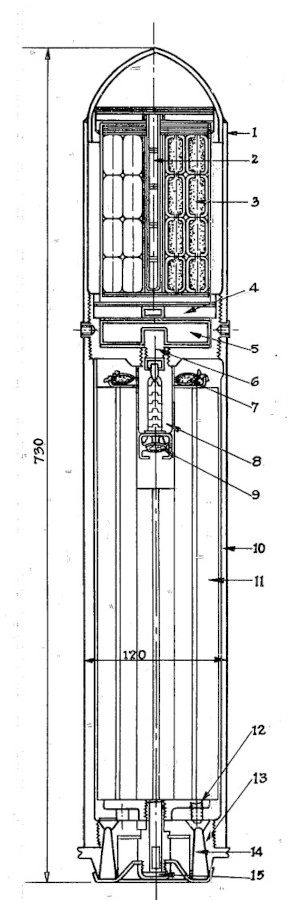
Section of a RoSa rocket.

These rockets were 12 cm (4.7 in) in diameter for 73 cm (29 in) long, and weighed 47 kg (104 lb). Similar to the "San Shiki", these rockets were made:

- 24 incendiary charges, that, once the rocket has exploded, would ignite and form long flames,
- Two explosive charges of 0.5 kg (1.1 lb), used to create a dispersion cone of 40 ° and 30 m (98 ft) in diameter, to create the barrier wall,
- A fuze, to adjust the triggering altitude of the explosive charge, and being adjustable to settings of 1,000 m (3,300 ft) or 1,500 m (4,900 ft),
- 6 rocket engines and their fuel, for propulsion, providing a maximal range of 4,800 m (5,200 yd).
  - The engines were arranged to provide rotational motion, stabilizing the rocket in flight.
  - They used "Special DT6" as fuel, a smokeless powder in solid tubes of 3.4 kg form, composed of 30% Nitroglycerin, 60% Nitrocellulose, 3% centralite (diethyl-diphenyl urea), and 7% mononitro naphthaline.

These rockets were deployed on a 28 tubes capacity rocket launcher, each rack having a length of 1 m (3.3 ft), and linked to the ship's anti-aircraft fire control system. The rockets were fired in pairs, with the ability to fire all 14 salvos in just 10 s, the rockets reaching a speed of 200 m/s (450 mph). The rockets had a maximum range of 4.8 km (16,000 ft), with a maximum altitude of 2.6 km (8,500 ft).

== See also ==
- San Shiki (anti-aircraft shell), a Navy shell using a similar technology.
- AA mine discharger, and Army anti-aircraft parachute mines mortar.
- Unrotated projectile, a British rocket launched parachute aerial mine system for ship defence.
