= Alwyn Crow =

British scientist

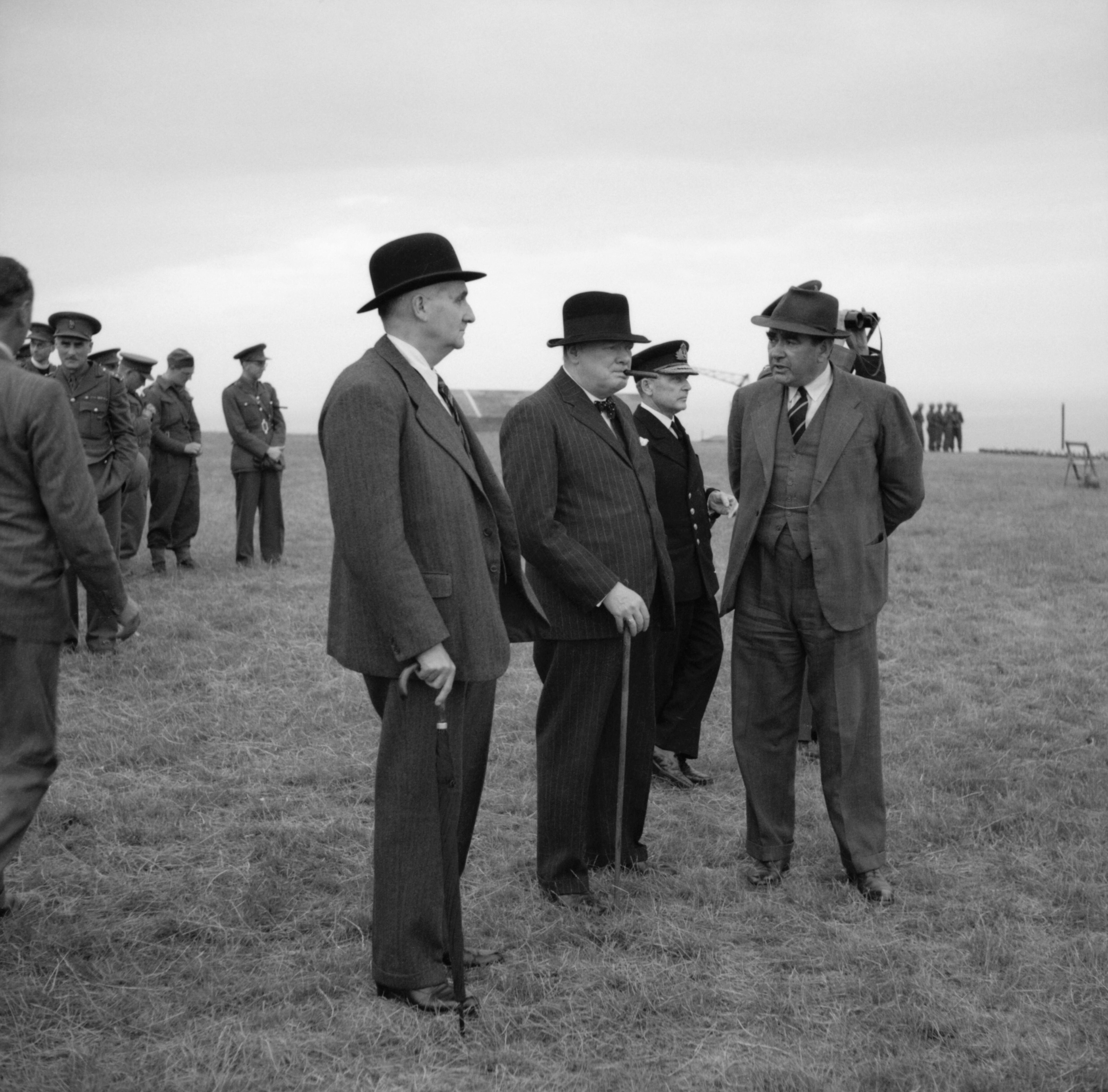
Crow talking with Winston Churchill at a demonstration of a secret anti-aircraft device.

Sir Alwyn Douglas Crow CBE FInstP (10 May 1894 – 5 February 1965) was a British scientist involved in research into ballistics, projectiles and missiles from 1916 to 1953. At Fort Halstead he developed the Unrotated Projectile an antiaircraft weapon for the Royal Navy, used in the early period of World War II when the supply of anti-aircraft guns was limited. His obituary in The Times called him a Rocket Projectile Pioneer.

He was born in London, and educated at Queens' College, Cambridge. In World War I he was commissioned in the East Surrey Regiment, was injured in 1916, and Mentioned in Despatches.

In 1917, he was appointed to the staff of the Royal Arsenal, Woolwich. He served as Director of Ballistics Research at Woolwich 1919–1939. In 1934 British received intelligence reports about German developments in rocket weapons, and two years later Crow led a new research team specializing in the topic. He later was Chief Superintendent of Projectile Development 1939-40, then Director and Controller of Projectile Development 1940-45, then Director of Guided Projectiles at the Ministry of Supply 1945–1946. He was in Washington, D.C. as Head of Technical Services to the British Joint Services Mission to Washington from 1946 to 1953. He retired in 1953, became a consultant and in 1960 settled in the United States with his second wife.

== Honours ==
He was appointed an Officer of the Order of the British Empire in the 1918 Birthday Honours and made a Commander of the Order in the 1937 Coronation Honours. He was knighted in 1944.

== Sources ==
- Obituary A Rocket Projectile Pioneer in The Times, London of 6 February 1965 p.10.
- Who was Who 1965 (A&C Black, London)
