= Basil Collier =

British military historian

John Basil Collier MBE (29 June 1908 – 1983) was a British writer of books of military history, particularly military aviation, World War II and military and political strategy. Collier became a full-time professional writer in 1932. Before the war he was a novelist, travel writer, critic and broadcaster.

== Life ==
He was in the Royal Air Force from 1940 to 1948, as a staff officer in Fighter Command to 1944. He worked in the Fighter Command HQ underground operations room and handled secret Ultra material from Bletchley Park. He assembled information about German long-range weapons, going to France and Belgium in late 1944, to investigate captured sites. He wrote that he was

...the member of the intelligence staff of ADGB responsible for keeping the Chief Intelligence Officer, Vorley Harris and the Air Officer Commanding Sir Roderic Hill, informed about the threat from the rocket.

— Collier

From 1944 to 1945 he was at SHAEF headquarters in Versailles. At the end of the war in Europe he was appointed Air Historical Officer, Fighter Command. After leaving the RAF in 1948, he went to the Cabinet Office as a historian and wrote the official history volume The Defence of the United Kingdom; giving his address in the preface as Falmer, Sussex. Since 1957 he has been a free-lance writer on military topics. In 1964 he was married with three children and living in Sussex.

His books Barren Victories and The Lion and the Eagle emphasize the importance he saw in the "Anglo-Saxon" alliance of Britain and America. A review of his A Short History of the Second World War by Dr Holley criticised his "partisan" overly British viewpoint and his reliance largely on secondary sources and on British sources, even for the war against Japan, where American forces predominated. A review by Robert Blake of a later biography of Sir Henry Wilson said that Collier's attempt to rehabilitate Wilson in his 1961 biography Brasshat carried little conviction, because of his uncritical admiration for Wilson.

== Works ==
- Jam Tomorrow (1935, novel)
- Local Thunder (1936, novel)
- To Meet the Spring (1937, travel)
- Catalan France (1939)
- Leader of the Few: the authorised biography of Air Chief Marshal Lord Dowding of Bentley Priory (1957)
- The Quiet Places (1957, travel in England)
- Heavenly Adventurer: a biography of Sir Sefton Brancker (1959)
- Brasshat: A biography of Field Marshal Sir Henry Wilson (1961)
- The Defence of the United Kingdom (1962, Official history)
- The Battle of Britain (1962, Batsford's British Battles series)
- Barren Victories: Versailles to Suez 1918–1956 (1964)
- The Battle of the V-Weapons 1944–1945 (1964)
- A Short History of the Second World War (1967)
- The War in the Far East 1941–1945 (1969)
- The Lion and the Eagle: British and Anglo-American Strategy 1900–1950 (1972)
- The Airship (1974)
- A History of Air Power (1974)
- Japan at War: An illustrated history of the war in the Far East (1975)
- Japanese Aircraft of World War II (1979)
- Arms and the Men: the arms trade and governments (1980)
- Hidden Weapons: Allied Secret or Undercover Services in World War II (1982)
