= Contrast seeker =

Missile guidance system

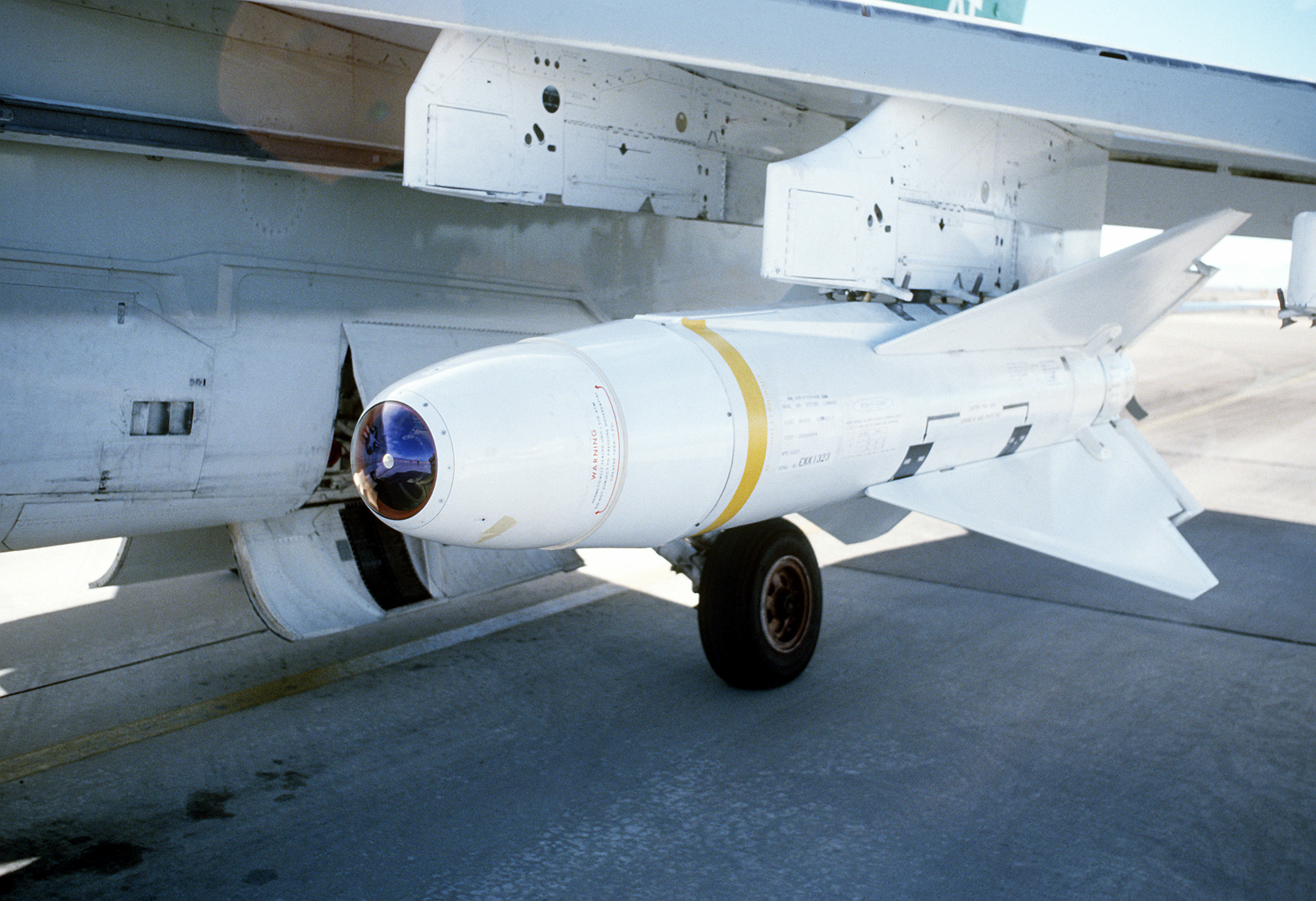
The Walleye combined a contrast seeker with a data link to the launch aircraft that allowed manual override.

Optical contrast seekers, or simply contrast seekers, are a type of missile guidance system using a television camera as its primary input. The camera is initially pointed at a target and then locked on, allowing the missile to fly to its target by keeping the image stable within the camera's field of view.

The first production missile to use a contrast seeker was the AGM-65 Maverick, which began development in the 1960s and entered service in 1972. The system has not been widely used, as other guidance technologies like laser guidance and GPS have become more common, but the same basic concept is used in cameras to track objects, including the systems used to aim the laser designators.

Contrast seekers should be distinguished from television guidance systems, in which a live television signal is broadcast to the launch platform, which then uses manual direction to attack the target. Examples of TV guidance include the Martel and AGM-62 Walleye. The term "contrast contour" is sometimes used, but this may be confused with TERCOM systems.

== Basic concept ==
Analog television cameras scan an image as a series of horizontal lines that are stacked vertically to form a grid or "frame". The camera's progression through the frame is carefully controlled by electronic timers, known as time base generators, that produce smoothly increasing voltages. As the camera scans the image, the brightness of the location currently being scanned is also represented as a voltage. The series of varying voltages from the sensor forms an amplitude modulated (AM) signal that encodes the brightness variations along any given scan line. Additional voltage spikes are added to the signal to indicate when the line or frame ends.

The contrast seeker is a simple device that can be implemented using basic analog electronics. It first uses some form of automatic gain control to adjust the image brightness until it contains some areas with high-contrast spots. This produces a bias voltage signal to represent the background brightness level, making brighter objects stand out. Any rapid change in contrast along a given scan line causes the voltage from the camera to suddenly change. If the change is greater than a selected threshold, it triggers a second circuit that sends the output of the two scanning time base generators into capacitors. Thus, the capacitors store a voltage value representing the Y and X locations of any high contrast spot within the image.

The image from the missile's camera is also sent into the cockpit where it appears on a small television screen, often one of the aircraft's multi-function displays. The missile is initially brought onto the target manually, normally using a small cueing input on the pilot's control stick, or by the weapons officer in a two-seat aircraft. When the trigger is pressed to pickle the target, the contrast threshold circuits are turned on when the camera is scanning locations close to the pickled location on the screen. Any high-contrast images within that area will then be memorized. Normally the recorded spot is indicated on the screen, normally with a square around the selected location. The operator can select other high-contrast spots within the image in an attempt to select one that is either on the target or very close to it.

Once a suitable target image has been selected, the seeker enters tracking mode. In this mode, the output from the camera is ignored except when it is scanning close to the original pickled location. In those locations the circuit triggers as normal, sending the output to a second set of capacitors. By comparing the voltages in the two sets of capacitors, the difference in location between the originally selected spot and the current spot is output as an error signal. This is sent into the seeker's gimbal mounting to turn the camera so it re-aligns with the original location. The guidance system then compares the angle of the camera to the angle of the missile body and sends commands to the aerodynamic controls to bring it back onto a collision course. To address the need to track moving targets, a proportional navigation system is normally used, which naturally produces the required lead.

== Problems ==
Contrast seekers are subject to problems when the contrast spot changes. This can occur quite easily if the target changes angle, causing the absolute brightness of the object to change, or if it moves, which can change the contrast relative to the surroundings. For instance, a tank on a roadway might provide a very high contrast tracking spot, only to have that disappear when it drives off the road into low bush. It can also be fooled by artificial lighting changes and similar effects. This is the reason that the timers are "gated", to limit the area in which the changes can take place without breaking lock.

One solution to this problem is to use infrared imaging instead of visible light. This is particularly well suited to long-wave infrared cameras that image the heat signature of the target. This is very effective against vehicles like tanks, where the engine produces an excellent high-contrast image to seek on, and few other objects in nature will generate a similar signal. However, this also greatly adds to the cost of the seeker, especially in the 1970s when this technology was new, and also limits it to uses against vehicles or other hot sources. This means the aircraft has to carry two types of missiles, ones with IR for vehicles, and ones with visible light seekers for attacking other targets like bridges or bunkers.

A more subtle problem is that the contrast seeker, unlike most seeker systems, loses accuracy as it approaches the target. This is due to the image of the tracking point growing as it approaches. What might have been a single pixel on the screen when the missile was launched from 10 km away might extend over dozens of pixels by the time it has reached a kilometer from the target. At that point the tracking logic no longer works as naturally, any area within the gated range will now return a positive signal, causing the seeker to track back and forth within the area.

Early contrast seekers thus used a second system that noticed the target spot beginning to spread over several pixels and lock the approach angle into a coasting phase once this happened. This means last-minute movements of the target or any remaining tracking error cannot be addressed. However, systems that aimed for the center of an extended target appeared even by the early 1970s, and modern systems can apply any required level of image processing desired to address this concern.

== Examples ==
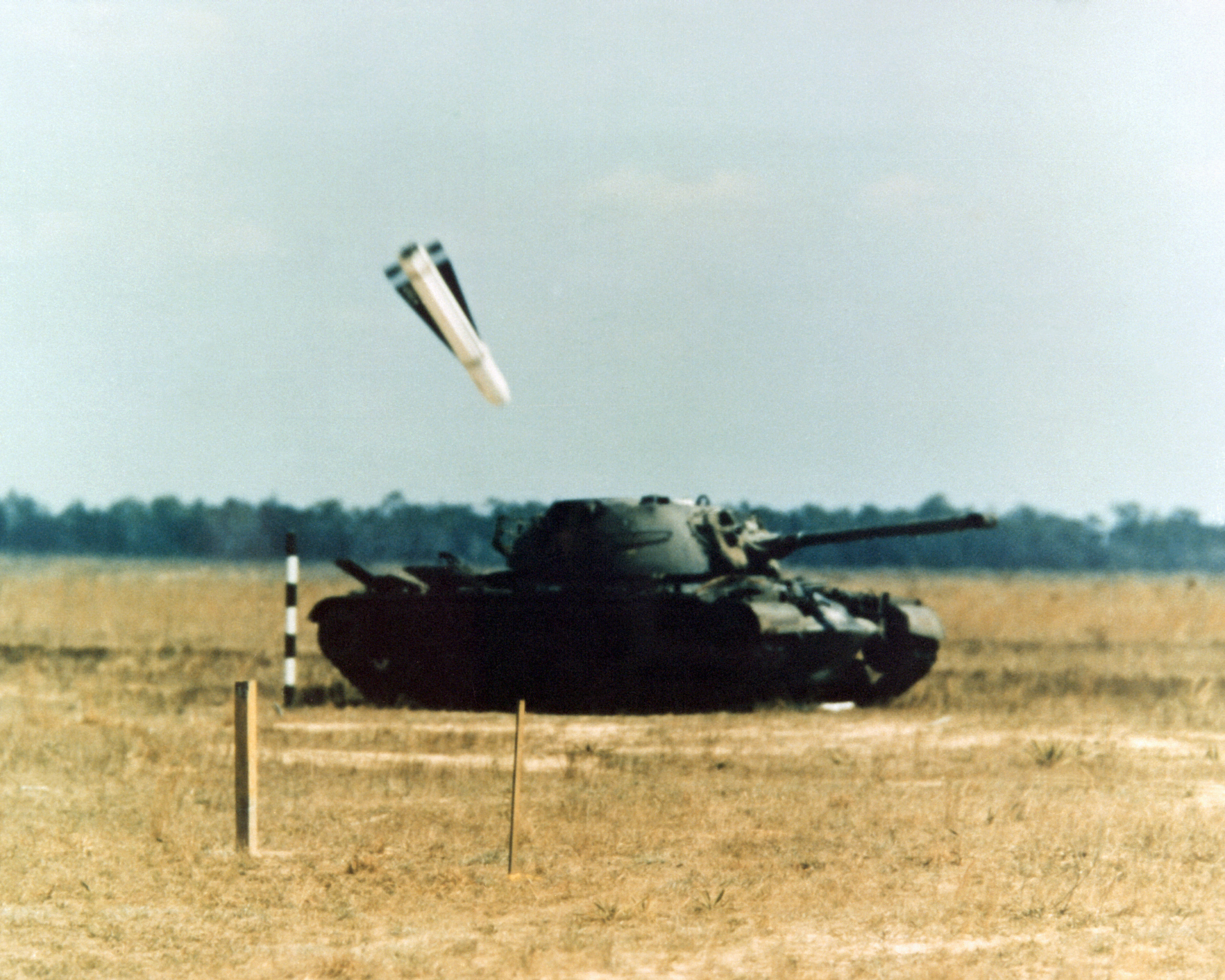
In service, Maverick demonstrated an average miss distance of only four feet from the aim point.

The basic concept has been used in various forms since the 1940s. One of the earliest examples is the Aeronca GB-5 (GB for Glide Bomb) which was intended as an anti-shipping system. This was essentially a bomb equipped with short straight wings and small tail surfaces with a tracking system from Hammond-Crosley called the B-1. Unlike later examples, this used a mechanical scanning system, with two photocells examining changes in contrast as the seeker oscillated left and right. This worked well against ships, where the ship was the only thing breaking the horizon line. This was one of many different tracking systems carried out as part of the GB series, which also included television guidance, semi-active radar homing, infrared homing and any number of different MCLOS radio control systems.

The best-known example of a contrast seeking missile is the Maverick, which has been in continual use since the early 1970s. In some early combat uses in the Vietnam War, pilots on their very first mission "vaporized" a truck with a direct hit, only to be admonished by their commanding officer for using a $25,000 weapon against a $500 target. Despite this, the pilots were extremely enthusiastic about the weapon and it became a staple of the USAF during the 1970s. In total, 99 missiles were fired during the Linebacker raids in 1972, achieving an 88% hit rate.

Starting in 1967, the same basic seeker was also adapted as the basis for the Homing Bomb System, or HOBOS, which was a guidance package fit to a standard 2,000 pounds (910 kg) Mark 84 bomb. The guidance systems, the KMU-353 and KMU-390, were essentially re-packaged Maverick A-model seekers, while the KMU-359/B used the later IR imager version from the D-model Mavericks. When completely assembled, the seeker, guidance system and bomb were known as the GBU-8, or GBU-9 when used with the 3,000 pounds (1,400 kg) Mark 118 bomb. An update program started in 1972 to address concerns about lock-on range, resulting in the GBU-15. This differed primarily in that it sent the image back to the launch aircraft while the missile was in flight, allowing the weapon officer to correct its trajectory in a fashion more similar to other television-guided systems.

A major problem discovered by the crews in early testing was that the image was often too small to lock onto from long range, requiring an approach to distances well into the missile's range. On other occasions, the missile would lock onto nearby targets, in one case breaking off from a tank to land in a bush, which the crew quickly christened a "tactical bush". The use of videotape of the seeker's target allowed new crews to learn from their experience and quickly learn what sort of targets and encounters would lead to success.

The contrast seeker had several operational problems as well. Because of the environment they flew in, contrast seekers were generally not suitable to launch from helicopters, which led to experiments using wire guidance (TOW) or laser homing (Hellfire). Ultimately these systems proved suitable for launch from many types of platforms, and laser guidance in particular has become much more widespread. These systems often use the same basic tracking system as part of the laser designator system on the aircraft, keeping the camera or FLIR roughly pointed at the locked target in the same way it worked in the missile seeker.
