= Tychon (missile) =

British cold war air-to-surface missile project

- Type: air-to-surface missile
- Place of origin: United Kingdom

Production history
- Designed: early 1960s
- Manufacturer: Bristol Aeroplane

Specifications
- Warhead: various
- Guidance system: various
- Steering system: control surfaces
- Launch platform: various aircraft

Tychon was a British air-to-surface missile proposed by Bristol Aeroplane Company's Guided Weapons Division in the early 1960s. It was a development of the earlier Momentum Bomb proposal developed by Barnes Wallis at Vickers Aircraft. Neither entered production.

Momentum Bomb was an unpowered glide bomb intended to help strike aircraft remain outside enemy air defences while delivering tactical nuclear weapons. Tychon expanded on the basic concept, adding a rocket motor to increase range, and modular guidance systems that could be swapped for different missions, including both conventional and nuclear attacks and reconnaissance.

The project saw some official interest, but never much enthusiasm on the part of the Air Staff or the Admiralty. Many of the roles it was intended to fill were instead put into an Anglo-French development project, OR.1168, which emerged as the Martel.

== Momentum Bomb ==
The Momentum Bomb was invented during the era when toss bombing (or loft bombing) was the preferred method of delivering tactical nuclear weapons. This was designed to allow the aircraft to fly at low altitudes during the approach to protect it from anti-aircraft weapons. The aircraft flies directly toward the target, and then, at a pre-selected point, enters a climb. The bomb is released at a programmed point during the climb, which puts it on a ballistic path to the target. Immediately after release, the aircraft continues pitching up until it has performed a half-loop and is now flying away from the target. The aircraft then returns to low level to return to friendly lines.

The problem with toss bombing is that the aircraft begins to climb as it is approaching the target, which would normally be a valuable one and thus strongly protected. After release, the aircraft continues to climb, remaining in the Air Defence Zone (ADZ) as it executes its loop and eventually flies away. This opens the aircraft to attack during this period, which depends on the size of the ADZ.

The Momentum Bomb solved this problem by having the bomb perform the toss manoeuvre instead of the aircraft. Instead of approaching the target directly, the aircraft would fly a course along a tangent to the ADZ. At a pre-determined point, it would turn so that it was flying directly away from the target, which would now be behind it. Once stable along the new path, the bomb would be dropped. After release, the bomb would apply full up-elevator, causing it to perform the half loop and start approaching the target. Once the internal sensors indicated it had reached horizontal at the top of the loop, the elevators reversed and caused it to enter a gliding path toward the target.

The advantage to this system is that the aircraft never entered the ADZ, only the bomb did. Moreover, the aircraft remained at low level throughout the attack, meaning it was not exposed to any other anti-aircraft weapons in the approach or escape.

== Tychon ==
It is not clear whether Momentum Bomb was ever seriously considered for development, but Bristol found the concept interesting enough to propose a more flexible version. Instead of just being used for nuclear attacks, the Tychon concept was a modular design that could be used for a wide variety of missions. It retained the original stand-off nuclear attack role, but aided by a rocket motor that would allow the aircraft to stay much further from its target. The major change was to add swappable guidance systems, allowing the toss-bomb system to be replaced with ones that would turn it into an anti-radiation missile, add TV guidance, or allow it to fly a pre-programmed course to produce reconnaissance in protected areas.

The resulting weapon system was very similar to the original Momentum Bomb in general layout. At the extreme rear was a vertical stabilizer and elevator system not unlike those found on any high-speed aircraft. It lacked horizontal stabilizers, instead the wings were very narrow-chord and ran most of the length of the bomb, ending just in front of the elevators. The guidance systems were placed in a module on the top of the bomb, which gave it the appearance of a long cockpit like one might find on a trainer aircraft.

Tychon was intended to be carried by most of the strike aircraft then in service or on the drawing board. The English Electric Canberra was able to carry a single weapon, the V bombers, Blackburn Buccaneer and Hawker Siddeley P.1154 could carry two, and the TSR-2 could carry four. There were also outlines of launchers from trucks, or from the Seaslug launchers on the County-class destroyers.

== Cancellation ==
In 1962, the Royal Air Force issued requirement OR.1168 for a missile that could be used as a TV guided precision guidance weapon, or be fitted with an anti-radiation seeker. Although it would seem Tychon was perfect for this role, and was submitted for it, the Air Ministry was not convinced that the funding for its development would be available. In October, Under Secretary of State at the Air Ministry wrote to Deputy Chief of the Air Staff Air Marshal Sir Ronald Lees, stating "I believe, however, that we would get a simpler and cheaper weapon by teaming up with the French."

The French had also been considering a similar anti-radiation weapon, the Matra R630, as well as other air-to-surface weapons derived from AS.30. Formal discussions began in November 1963. During this period, de Havilland Propellers, recently renamed Hawker Siddeley Dynamics, had been working on a TV guided design known as RG.10. When the discussion began, de Havilland began adapting their proposal to the French missile designs, which became AS.37. Tychon was abandoned as it became clear this would be the winning design.
