= Orange Nell =

British short-range surface-to-air missile

Orange Nell, a rainbow code name, was a 1950s design for a short-range surface-to-air missile (SAM) to defend Royal Navy ships against supersonic strike aircraft and anti-ship missiles. It was designed to be mounted on any ship capable of carrying the QF 5.25-inch naval gun, whose turret would be replaced by a twin-rail missile launcher and 40-round magazine. Started in 1953, (Note: Friedman says "around 1954".) the system was intended to offer performance against missile developments into the 1970s.

During development a problem was raised that ultimately led to its cancelation. The issue involved the warhead of the target missile; as these were designed to penetrate armour, they were very robust. While Orange Nell could reliably destroy the missile itself, it was not clear that the warhead would be damaged. Given the close quarters engagements, the warhead might continue on to impact the ship anyway. In 1957 the decision was made to concentrate only on long-range interception, preventing the enemy missile from being launched in the first place.

An even slower and shorter-range weapon, Seacat, would enter service a few years later filling the identical role.

== History ==
=== Popsy and Mopsy ===
The first consideration of a short-range surface-to-air missile (SAM) for the Royal Navy began in 1946 under the name "Popsy". This was a small subsonic missile intended to be used against glide bombs like the German war-era Fritz-X. Official development was ordered as GD.81/48 in 1948, now upgraded to deal with bombs manoeuvring at up to 1 gee, like the UK's own Blue Boar. Some development had taken place when the requirement was changed. Now the primary threat was seen to be transonic jet aircraft, which demanded a supersonic missile to effectively counter. This produced Popsy B, which was larger and faster but otherwise similar.

By this time some concern about the development time of missile systems was being raised, and the Navy began considering a new dedicated short-range anti-aircraft gun known as DACR to fill this role instead. Two concepts were considered, with the winner being a six-barrelled gatling gun firing Oerlikon 34 mm ammunition. Ultimately all of these concepts were considered not worth continuing and Popsy and DACR were cancelled in 1950. Popsy was briefly revived as Mopsy to GD.164/55 using the US AAM-N-5 Meteor missile and the Popsy radars, but this project was ultimately cancelled as well.

=== Missiles ===
In 1953 the Navy learned of the Soviet KS-1 Komet missile, known within NATO as "Kennel". This was essentially a scaled-down MiG-15 with a simple radar seeker and a 600 pounds (270 kg) armour-piercing warhead. As the Seaslug long-range SAM project was winding down, the Ministry of Supply felt there would be manpower for a new project and released a new contract which was assigned the rainbow code "Orange Nell". The design was intended to be small enough to be fitted to a frigate while still offering enough performance to deal with projected supersonic anti-ship developments like the UK's own Green Cheese. It was believed would allow the system to be useful into the 1970s.

The design quickly settled on a mildly supersonic design of about Mach 1.2 (1,470 km/h; 913 mph) with a maximum range of 5 nautical miles (9.3 km; 5.8 mi) and minimum effective range of 1 nautical mile (1.9 km; 1.2 mi). Ideally, interceptions would take place at about 1.5 nautical miles (2.8 km; 1.7 mi). The system would use an S band search radar to look for targets and then hand them off to a X band or Q band continuous wave radar for tracking and firing. From initial handoff to missile launch was 10 seconds as long as the electronics on the missile were warmed up – this being the vacuum tube era. The missile would be launched from a twin-rail launcher above a 40-round magazine designed to drop-in replace the QF 5.25-inch naval gun.

Although the design seemed within the state of the art, a new problem was raised. As the warhead of the anti-ship missile was designed to pierce the armour of a warship, it was quite robust and unlikely to be damaged by the 100 pounds (45 kg) continuous-rod warhead of the SAM. Although it was extremely likely the missile itself would be destroyed if hit by this weapon, because the KS-1 approached its target in a dive it was possible the warhead itself would continue on and hit the ship. The only way to ensure this did not occur would be to attack the missile at a greater distance so that it would safely fall into the sea. To do so, the Orange Nell missile would have to be larger to increase the range, making it too large to easily fit in the gun well.

The conclusion was that the only way to defend the ships against missiles like Kennel would be to attack the launcher aircraft before they got into range using a dedicated long-range SAM like Seaslug. Orange Nell was cancelled in 1957.

=== Seacat ===
Perhaps surprisingly, a missile of significantly less performance would soon be introduced to fill the Orange Nell role. This was the Short Brothers Seacat. While Orange Nell had been designed to fit into the 5.25-inch gun installations, Seacat was designed to replace the existing Bofors 40mm guns widely used on Navy ships. This was a much smaller mount, which demanded a much smaller, subsonic, manually guided weapon. In spite of this much lower performance, its small size and light weight allowed it to be fit to almost any combat ship and offer better performance than the Bofors. It saw widespread use into the late 1970s when it was replaced by Sea Wolf.
