= Popsy (missile) =

British naval short-range surface-to-air missile

Popsy was a development concept for a small surface-to-air missile (SAM) intended to protect Royal Navy ships from guided bombs and anti-shipping missiles. It was one of several concepts considered for this role, none of which were built. The Orange Nell project took over the role in the 1950s, and was similarly never built. The role was eventually filled by Seacat, a manually-guided system of otherwise similar performance.

== History ==
=== Initial studies ===
The concept for a short-range anti-aircraft missile emerged in the late World War II era after the Royal Navy was attacked by German Fritz X and similar weapons. This led to some consideration of a system known as Longshot, leading to a 1946 Staff Requirement. Development was not funded by the Defence Research Policy Committee. Continued developments in missile technology led to the system becoming Popsy by May 1947.

Through the same period, consideration was also given to a new high-performance gun system, the DACR. Two concepts emerged, a 3-inch/L70 weapon that offered dual-use possibilities, and a smaller 34 mm revolver cannon firing at about 4,000 rounds per minute. Studies demonstrated that the larger weapon would only have a 20% chance of downing a glide bomb that was manoeuvring at 1G, the basic performance of the Navy's own Blue Boar project. The smaller system would have a 94% chance of downing a manoeuvring bomb, but only if it fired 1,500 rounds at 10,000 rounds per minute, which appeared well beyond any possible system.

=== Popsy ===
A new team formed to reconsider the Popsy concept and delivered their report on 1 April 1949. The system consisted of a small unpowered dart that was shot to speed using a drop-off booster. The complete system weighed about 300 pounds (140 kg) and was 5 feet 8 inches (1.73 m) long, allowing 110 to be carried in ready-to-fire form in the weapon bay for the standard QF 4.5-inch naval gun found on many Navy ships.

The dart would be guided using semi-active radar homing with a new Q band radar illuminator. The resolution of any optical system, including radar, is based on the size of the aperture (or antenna) and inversely with wavelength. Using a very short wavelength, 8.6 mm in this case, would allow the radar to be tightly focused using even a small antenna, forming a very thin pencil beam that could be aimed to avoid the surface of the ocean and thus avoid spurious reflections that would confuse the seeker in the missile.

In a typical engagement, the ship's main search radar would begin tracking the target at 12,000 to 14,000 yards (11,000 to 13,000 m) and hand off the coordinates to the illuminator. This would begin continuous wave tracking at 10,000 to 12,000 yards (9,100 to 11,000 m) and the launcher would slew to the target at 8,000 yards (7,300 m). The missile would fire at about 4,000 to 5,000 yards (3,700 to 4,600 m) and fly subsonically to the target. It was initially assumed that it would have an average miss distance on the order of 25 feet (7.6 m), giving it a 75% chance of killing a guide bomb, or 94% if two were fired. Later versions had supersonic speed and a 60 feet (18 m) miss distance, lowering the probability of kill to 65% for a single shot.

=== Mopsy ===
As the Ministry of Supply was already overloaded with missile projects, in July 1950 a Navy team approached their counterparts in the US Navy Bureau of Ordnance on the possibility of a joint effort. The British would contribute their Q band radar illuminator while the US would develop the missile itself. However, the US Navy was much more interested in a longer-range weapon and had begun development of their AAM-N-5 Meteor that was roughly equivalent to Sea Slug in role, but with higher performance.

The Navy team considered Meteor as potentially suitable for the Popsy role, and wrote a report on this concept in Many 1950. They convinced the developers at the Massachusetts Institute of Technology to adopt a narrow-beam X band radar instead of their original wide-beam concept which would suffer reflections. They referred to this concept as Mopsy, but the US Navy rejected any changes to the Meteor concept. Meteor was ultimately cancelled in 1953 as solid-fuel systems like RIM-2 Terrier matured.

=== After Popsy ===
The SAM requirement remained open. This led to a 1954 program known as Orange Nell to fill the same role, with the hopes that as work on Sea Slug concluded that there would be some ability to develop a new missile. Staff Requirement GD45 was issued in 1956, but once again no work was carried out.

This was due largely to the reduction in the assumed threat from a maneuvering supersonic weapon like Blue Boar to a subsonic non-maneuvering weapon similar to the V-1 flying bomb, after information about Soviet weapons like the P-15 Termit (Styx) became available in the mid-1960s. Such a weapon was much easier to attack with guns, and another meeting of the DACR group concluded that the latest L70 model of the Bofors 40 mm gun with proximity fused rounds would be almost as effective as the advanced guns being considered like Red Queen. The Bofors was widely fit through the 1950s.

In 1958, the Navy declared that any ship without a SAM would be obsolete, leading to yet another study, the Small Ship Guided Weapon, issued October 1960. The First Sea Lord authorized development on 5 December 1960, but this eventually emerged as a much more capable weapon, Sea Dart. Sea Dart was too large to fit to frigates, thereby not filling the originally intended role. Some studies were carried out on frigates armed with Sea Dart, but came to nothing.

Meanwhile, a private program at Short Brothers to convert the Malkara anti-tank missile to radio-command guidance led to Seacat, which entered service in 1962 and finally filled the original Popsy requirement.
