= Red Angel =

Red Angel may refer to:

- Melchor Rodríguez García (1883–1972), the Spanish politician and anarcho-syndicalist known by the nickname The Red Angel
- Red Angel (film) (赤い天使, Akai Tenshi), a 1966 Japanese film directed by Yasuzo Masumura
- Red Angel (rocket), the rainbow code name for a British anti-ship unguided rocket
