= Popsy =

Popsy may refer to:

- "Popsy" (short story), by Stephen King
- Popsy (horse) (born 1990), Thoroughbred racehorse who won the New Zealand Derby in 1993
- Popsy (missile), a British Navy concept for a short-range anti-aircraft missile
- Nickname of C. M. Payne (1873–1964), American cartoonist best known for his comic strip S'Matter, Pop?
- Popsy Dixon, a member of the American music trio The Holmes Brothers
- Ershad Moinuddin Popsy, original drummer of the Bangladeshi band Feedback
- "Popsy", a track from the 1966 album Happiness Is by Ray Coniff
- Popsy, a character in the 1993–2000 TV sitcom Oki Doki Doc
- "Popsy", the dominant woman in a relationship between female prisoners – see Prison sexuality
