= Blue Boar (bomb) =

- Type: Guided glider bomb
- Place of origin: UK

Production history
- Manufacturer: Vickers

Specifications
- Mass: 5,000 lb (2,300 kg)–10,000 lb (4,500 kg)
- Guidance system: Television, with remote manual operator
- Steering system: Movable flight control surfaces
- Launch platform: Aircraft

The Vickers Blue Boar was a family of British air-launched television-guided glide bombs of the 1950s which was cancelled during development. A key role was as an anti-shipping missile, using its guidance system to attack the moving targets. It would also replace unguided bombs between 5,000 and 10,000 lb (2,300 and 4,500 kg) against point targets, or be equipped with a nuclear warhead. A smaller 1,000 lb (450 kg) version was also developed for testing. The name is a randomly assigned rainbow code.

The goal of the system was to allow the bomb to be guided to 100 yards (91 m) of its target after being dropped from a jet bomber flying at 50,000 ft (15,000 m) altitude. It could manoeuvre at up to 3.5G so that it could quickly be aimed after breaking through cloud cover as low as 10,000 ft (3,000 m). Nuclear-armed versions were primarily intended to provide the launching aircraft with some stand-off range and avoid overflying the target, gliding about 50,000 to 60,000 feet (9.5 to 11.4 mi; 15 to 18 km) from the launch point. In this role, guidance using H2S radar instead of the television camera was considered.

Development was cancelled when it proved too large for a newer generation of jet-powered naval strike aircraft while the nuclear stand-off role went to the much longer ranged Blue Steel. The anti-ship role went to a series of weapons, all of which were cancelled, before finally emerging as another television guided weapon, Martel.

== Development ==
The low accuracy of bombing during World War II led most air forces to begin experiments with guidance systems. The only fully operational devices were the German Luftwaffe's glide bombs, notably Fritz-X which was used against the Royal Navy with some success during 1943. The USAAF also introduced similar systems late in the war, which saw limited use in Europe and in the Far East. In 1946, the UK Air Staff published a report on the Control of Bombs which led to a November 1947 development proposal by the Royal Aircraft Establishment (RAE). Starting in March 1949, the RAE released a series of technical notes describing such a weapon.

A development contract was won by Vickers under Operational Requirement 1059 (OR.1059). Barnes Wallis began development under the rainbow code name "Blue Boar". Initial design reports suggested a single weapon system could carry between 5,000 and 10,000 lb (2,300 and 4,500 kg) bombs as their payload. It had to be able to manoeuvre at 3 to 3.5G at sea level in order to provide the required accuracy, but also making them extremely difficult to shoot down. For nighttime use, a second 5,000 lb (2,300 kg) bomb on the same guidance channels would follow three seconds behind the first, and ignite a series of flares once reaching 10,000 ft (3,000 m) altitude, providing illumination for the television camera. An even larger version, Special Blue Boar, could carry up to 20,000 lb (9,100 kg), as it was noted that a single larger bomb would be easier to guide than several smaller ones. This was intended for carriage on the emerging V-bomber force. There was also consideration given to guiding these bombs with H2S radar for true blind bombing.

The design consisted of a cylindrical midsection carrying four large rectangular wings with control flaps at the end of each wing. The wings were stored within the bomb casing and forced outward on launch using air pressure from a small air bottle. An ogive nose cone carried the EMI television camera and fuse, while a small boat-tail rear section contained a stabilized antenna to send television imagery to the launch aircraft and receive commands from it. Using valve-based electronics, most of the midsection of the bomb contained four large electronics boxes, with the warhead in front, just behind the nose section. The autopilot was from Smiths Aviation, and the hydraulics powering the controls were from British Messier. For nuclear-armed versions the warhead would be a modified Blue Danube.

The bomb would be dropped well before the aircraft reached the target. It was designed to fall at an angle of about 40 degrees above the horizon, and a gyroscopic system was used to produce a "datum" spot in the television signal that represented that desired angle. The television had a square scanning pattern, but only the center was in sharp focus, representing a field of view about 55 degrees wide. On the receiver television, a crosshair was used by the bomb aimer to keep the target aligned with the bomb's line-of-sight. The controls were designed to allow the bomb to be put on target within six seconds of breaking through clouds at 10,000 ft altitude. This was designed to provide a circular error probable of 100 yards (91 m) when dropped from 50,000 ft altitude.

EMI carried out a number of tests of the television system against the town of Westbury, Wiltshire as a sample target. This started with normal aerial photography that was optically degraded to what they expected the television signal to look like at night when illuminated by flares. The same images were then recorded from a television monitor. These demonstrated fairly good performance but were subject to multipath distortion. EMI suggested this could be reduced if the system moved from the 300 MHz transmission link to microwave frequencies, (Note: Which, for a variety of reasons, can be much more tightly focused than VHF and thus avoid stray signals reflecting off the ground and other objects.) and that the quality of the image would be greatly improved by moving to millimetre wavelengths and using the improved bandwidth to carry the signal from a higher resolution Emitron camera. (Note: Given the time frame, it is likely they were referring to Super-Emitron, or image iconoscope.)

Much depended on the quality of the camera stabilization and the link from the bomb to the bomber. To test these, the camera system was fit into the nose of WM262, a Gloster Meteor NF.11 night fighter, replacing the AI Mk. X radar. Vickers test pilot Philip ("Spud") Murphy would dive the aircraft at 40 degrees to simulate the ever-growing image of the target that would be seen by the bomb aimer.

Trials were carried out in the UK and Woomera starting in the summer of 1953, where it was dropped from the Vickers Valiant. The project was cancelled in June 1954, (Note: Forbat says August, but this is likely referring to test launches that occurred after the official cancellation.) due to it growing too heavy to be carried by naval aircraft in the anti-ship role while at the same time the Blue Steel missile provided much longer stand-off range in the strategic role and did not require the launch aircraft to remain in the area for guidance. Vickers had spent about £3.1 million on development and had suggested it be continued as it was almost ready for service.

The design was later modified for use as the Green Cheese anti-ship missile. This was essentially a combination of the Blue Boar casing with the radar seeker from the Red Dean air-to-air missile and the Red Beard warhead. This also proved too heavy and was ultimately cancelled. Ultimately, the role was filled by the Martel, another television-guided weapon.

Only a single example is known to exist today, on display at the Brooklands Museum.
