= Red Angel (rocket) =

British anti-ship unguided rocket

- Place of origin: UK

Specifications
- Mass: 1,055 lb (479 kg)
- Length: 10 ft 9 in (3.28 m)
- Diameter: 11.25 in (286 mm)
- Warhead weight: 88 lb (40 kg)

Red Angel, a rainbow code name, was an anti-ship unguided rocket developed for the Royal Navy's Fleet Air Arm (a joint Naval and Air Staff requirement) as a counter to the Soviet Union's Sverdlov-class cruiser. The goal was for a weapon with a range of 5,000 yards (4,600 m), enough to keep the aircraft out of the range of the ship's anti-aircraft guns.

A number of problems with the system were found during development, along with changes to the Fleet Air Arm makeup. These led to the conclusion that more range was needed, as much as 10,000 yards (9,100 m). Red Angel was cancelled in 1956 in favour of the longer-ranged Green Cheese.

== History ==
=== Earlier systems ===
RP-3 ("Three-inch") rockets were used successfully for anti-shipping attacks during World War II. A version with a solid armour piercing warhead replacing the large high explosive model was introduced with the goal of puncturing the hull of U-boats and thus forcing them to remain surfaced where they could be easily attacked. Attacks with this weapon demonstrated an unusual behaviour: a projectile that entered the water short of the target would steer itself upwards on a curving trajectory and travel horizontally. This not only encouraged a more damaging 'wet hit' below the waterline, but it also made targeting easier: the viable target zone on the sea ahead of the target had an apparent height twice that of the hull.

Larger unguided rockets taking advantage of this effect were developed at the end of the war, such as the 'Uncle Tom' to meet Operational Requirement OR.1009. This used six of the three-inch (76 mm) rocket motors in a 9 ft (2.7 m) airframe of 11.5 in (290 mm) diameter, much larger and more powerful that the RP-3, giving it the performance to use against larger ships. It entered testing on a Grumman Avenger just as the war was ending. It continued to be tested and began to enter service on anti-shipping de Havilland Mosquitos in 1947.

=== Sverdlov crisis ===
Around 1950, the new Sverdlov-class cruisers caused concern in the Royal Navy, over the fear that the Soviet Navy was expanding into a wide-ranging blue-water navy. The Sverdlov class was the first major warship class constructed in the USSR after the Second World War, and was seen as provocative by NATO analysts; clearly, USSR was not content to relegate dominance of the oceans to the West. The most concerning aspect of the new cruiser was the implementation of fully-automated, radar-guided dual-purpose guns. The close-in air defenses of the Sverdlov class were assessed as having an effective range of an impressive 5 km (5,500 yd) against airborne targets, making direct attacks dangerous.

A concept for a new weapon able to be launched from outside this 5 km range was released under OR.1057, and eventually won by the Red Angel concept. This was essentially a larger Uncle Tom with a 500 pounds (230 kg) warhead, of which 88 pounds (40 kg) was high explosive. A salvo of six hits was thought to be sufficient to disable a Sverdlov.

Red Angel was not the only concept developed to deal with the Sverdlovs. At the same time, development began on "Bootleg", an air-dropped torpedo with a rocket booster that allowed it to be fired from about the same range as Red Angel. It was thought that a torpedo would have a much greater chance of hitting the target than the rocket, as it could hit the water as much as 1,000 yards (910 m) from the ship and still reach it, travelling at 70 knots (130 km/h; 81 mph). Further consideration led to the decision to cancel Bootleg as it was more complex to launch and would be more expensive to buy, and overall a "doubtful starter."

Red Angel testing began with a Westland Wyvern aircraft on Lake Alwen in 1954. Several problems were found; the rocket motor failed to ignite on occasion, a number broke up on impact with the water, and the folding fins were slow to extend in cold weather, leading to low accuracy in these conditions. As testing continued, it appeared the number that would have to be fired to guarantee good hits was too large to be carried by the Wyvern. Although a number of tests were successful, solving the various problems took time.

=== Cancellation ===
By 1956, the decision to remove the Wyvern from service was underway. The strike role would pass to a new jet-powered aircraft, NA.39 (which would enter service as the Blackburn Buccaneer), but this would leave the Navy with little strike capability over the short term. The decision was made to use the Fairey Gannet, an anti-submarine aircraft, in the strike role. This was a much slower and larger aircraft than the Wyvern, and the 5,000 yd standoff range was not considered sufficient to keep this aircraft safe.

Red Angel was cancelled, and a new concept was released for a weapon capable of being launched from 10,000 yards (9,100 m), able to disable the ships with a single hit. This was released to industry as OR.1123 which led to the much larger Green Cheese effort. Another advantage of the radar guided Green Cheese is that it could be launched from the much larger V bombers, which would offer a long-range anti-ship capability. Green Cheese was also cancelled in 1956 due to lack of money and scientific effort available.

Another issue was that the number of aircraft carriers in RN service was cut back, meaning that the Sverdlovs were going to have to be countered, at least on occasion, by surface ships. This led to the Blue Slug anti-ship missile, a modification of the surface-to-air Seaslug. The Blue Slug would be armed with Red Angel's warhead.

== Description ==
Red Angel was 10 feet 9 inches (3.28 m) long and 11.25 inches (286 mm) in diameter. Overall weight was 1,055 pounds (479 kg) with an 88-pound (40 kg) warhead.

It was first deployed on the Westland Wyvern turboprop, but had always been earmarked for the new jet naval strike aircraft developed in response to the Sverdlov threat, the Blackburn Buccaneer. The high-speed Buccaneer was noted for its rotating bomb bay and internal weapons stowage. This could carry four of the Red Angels.
