= GBU-8 =

American guided bomb, first used in 1969

GBU-8 Homing Bomb System (HOBOS)
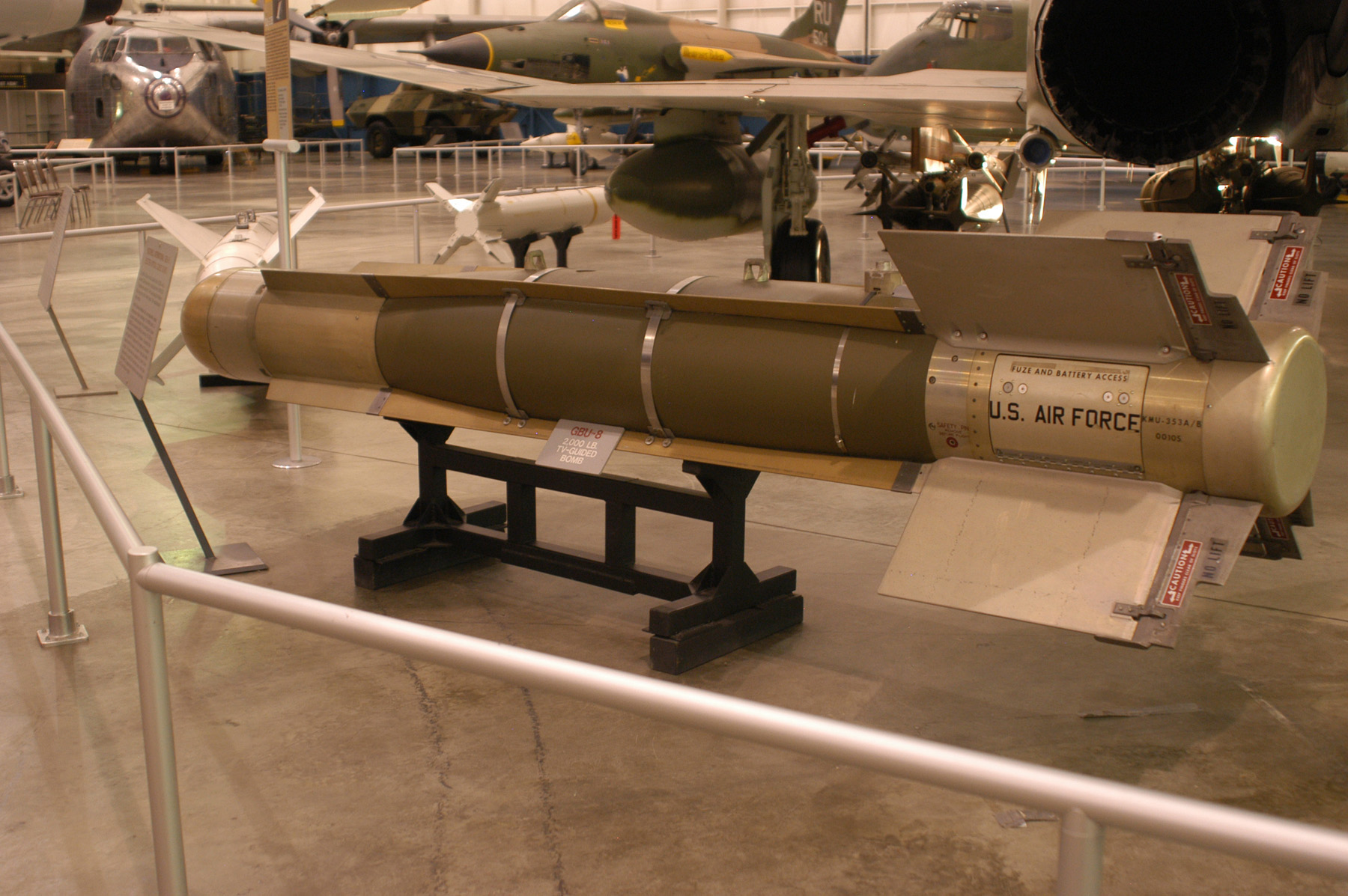
- Type: Electro-optical guided bomb
- Place of origin: United States

Service history
- Used by: United States
- Wars: Vietnam War; Yom Kippur War; 1982 Lebanon War

Production history
- Manufacturer: Rockwell

Specifications
- Mass: approx. 2,100 lb (950 kg)
- Length: 11 ft 11 in (3.63 m)
- Diameter: 18 in (46 cm)
- Wingspan: 3 ft 8 in (1.12 m)
- Effective firing range: 1,650 to 26,750 yards (1,510 to 24,460 m), depending on launch altitude
- Guidance system: Electro-optical
- Accuracy: 20 ft (6.1 m) CEP

The GBU-8 Homing Bomb System (HOBOS) is a 2,000 lb (910 kg) electro-optical guided bomb developed for the United States Air Force.

== Description ==
The GBU-8 consists of a contrast seeker in the nose section, four cruciform tailfins with flying surfaces for control, strakes connecting the tailfins with the nose section, and a 2000 lb Mk. 84 low-drag general-purpose bomb. The same type of guidance kit was also attached to a 3000 lb Mark 118 bomb, where it was designated GBU-9.

== History ==
Development of the Homing Bomb System (HOBOS) by Rockwell began in 1967 on the request of the U.S. Air Force in response to shortcomings of the AGM-62 Walleye during the Vietnam War. The payload of the 2000 lb Mk. 84 bomb was considered to be more effective than the smaller explosive warhead found on the Walleye, which was designed by the Navy for anti-ship use.

The system was deployed to USAF units at Ubon Royal Thai Air Force Base, Thailand in January 1969 and was subsequently used in combat for the first time in February 1969.

The HOBOS system was also used in Operation Linebacker with the 8th TFW once bombing resumed in April 1972. On 27 April 1972, the HOBOS guided bomb was used against the Thanh Hóa Bridge, with five bombs expended. In the strike against the Paul Doumer Bridge on 10 May 1972, seven HOBOS bombs and 22 laser-guided bombs were used.

Development of the basic HOBOS concept continued after the Vietnam War with the GBU-15, which built off of the basic concepts introduced with the GBU-8.

== Variants ==
- KMU-353A/B: Contrast-seeker guidance kit for 2000 lb Mk. 84 bomb
- KMU-359/B: Infrared guidance section
- KMU-390/B: Contrast-seeker guidance kit for 3000 lb M118 bomb

== Users ==
- (Israel) Israeli Air Force
- United States Air Force
- (Turkey) Turkish Air Force

== See also ==
- GBU-15
- AGM-62 Walleye
