= Television guidance =

Missile guidance system during World War II

Television guidance (TGM) is a type of missile guidance system using a television camera in the missile or glide bomb that sends its signal back to the launch platform. There, a weapons officer or bomb aimer watches the image on a television screen and sends corrections to the missile, typically over a radio control link. Television guidance is not a seeker because it is not automated, although semi-automated systems with autopilots to smooth out the motion are known. They should not be confused with contrast seekers, which also use a television camera but are true automated seeker systems.

The concept was first explored by the Germans during World War II as an anti-shipping weapon that would keep the launch aircraft safely out of range of the target's anti-aircraft guns. The best-developed example was the Henschel Hs 293, but the TV-guided versions of this weapon did not see operational use. The US also experimented with similar weapons during the war, notably the GB-4 and Interstate TDR. Only small numbers were used experimentally, with reasonable results.

Several systems were used operationally after the war. The British Blue Boar was cancelled after extensive testing. A separate line of development led to TV-guided versions of the Martel missile to fill the anti-shipping role. The US AGM-62 Walleye is a similar system attached to an unpowered bomb, the Soviet Kh-29 is similar.

Television guidance was never widely used, as the introduction of laser guided bombs and GPS weapons have generally replaced them. However, they remain useful when certain approaches or additional accuracy are needed. One famous use was the attack on the Sea Island oil terminals during the Gulf War, which required pinpoint accuracy and was attacked by television-guided GBU-15 bombs.

== History ==
=== German efforts ===
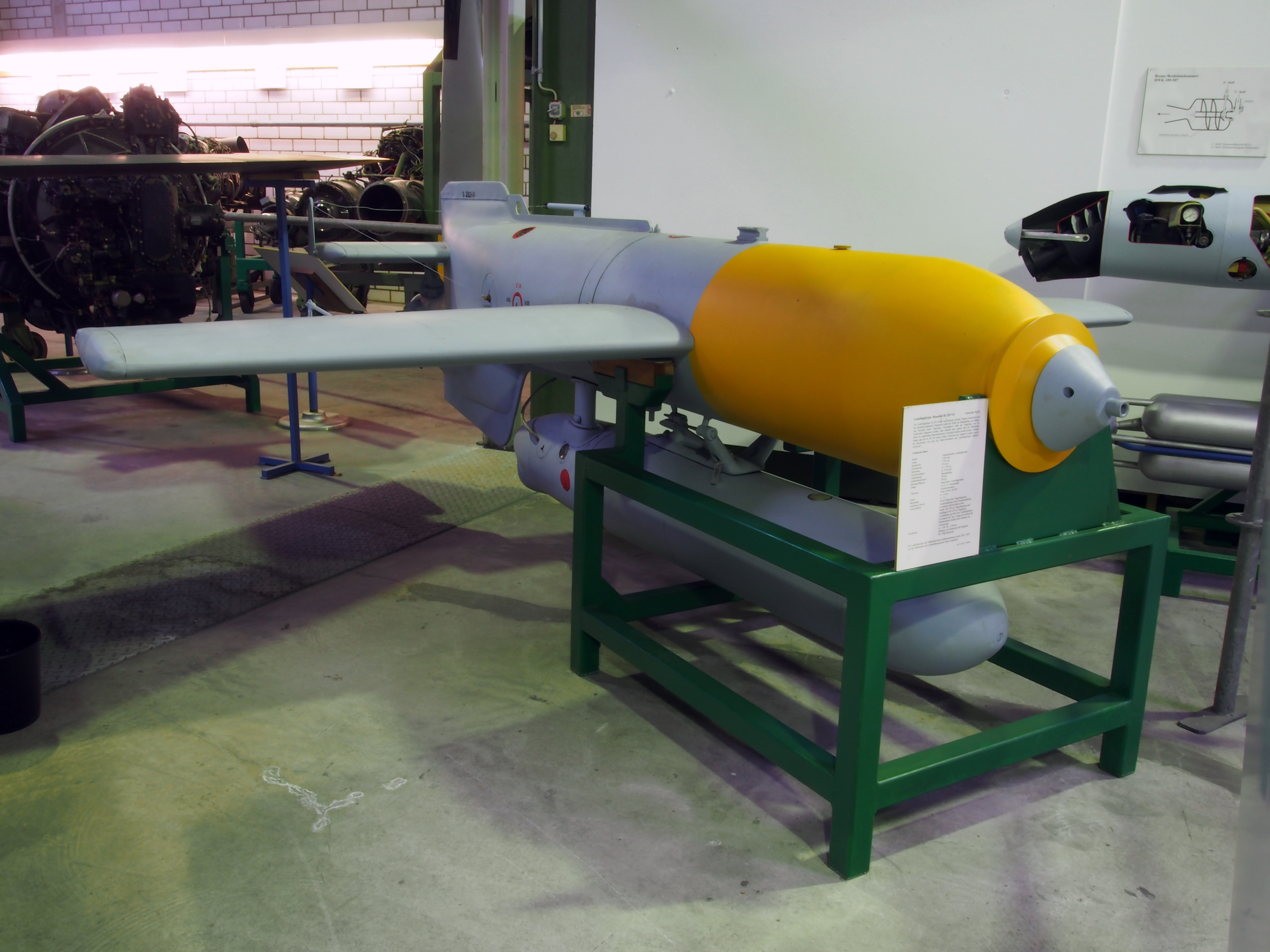
The Hs 293 was produced in a number of versions, like this early experimental A model (V4). The D model had an extended nose carrying the camera, and a Yagi antenna at the back to send the signal to the launch aircraft.

The first concerted effort to build a television-guided bomb took place in Germany under the direction of Herbert Wagner at the Henschel aircraft company starting in 1940. This was one of several efforts to produce usable guidance systems for the ongoing Hs 293 glide bomb project. The Hs 293 had originally been designed as a purely MCLOS system in which flares on the tail of the bomb were observed by the bomb aimer and the Kehl-Strassburg radio command set (Note: Kehl was the transmitter, Strassburg the receiver in the bomb.) sent commands to the bomb to align it with the target. The disadvantage of this approach is that the aircraft had to fly in such a way to allow the bomb aimer to view the bomb and target throughout the attack, which, given the cramped conditions of WWII bombers, significantly limited the directions the aircraft could fly. Any weather, smoke screens or even the problems of viewing the target at long range made the attack difficult.

Placing a television camera in the nose of the bomb appeared to offer tremendous advantages. For one, the aircraft was free to fly any escape course it pleased, as the bomb aimer could watch the entire approach on an in-cockpit television and no longer had to look outside the aircraft. It also allowed the bomb aimer to be located anywhere in the aircraft. Additionally, it could be launched through clouds or smoke screens and then pick up the target when it passes through them. More importantly, as the bomb approaches the target the image grows on the television screen, providing increased accuracy and allowing the bomb aimer to pick vulnerable locations on the target to attack.

At the time, television technology was in its infancy, and the size and fragility of both the cameras and receivers were unsuitable for weapon use. German Post Office technicians aiding the Fernseh company began the development of hardened miniaturized cameras and cathode ray tubes, originally based on the German pre-war 441-line standard. They found the refresh rate of 25 frames per second was too low, so instead of using two frames updating 25 times a second, they updated a single frame 50 times a second and displayed roughly half the resolution. In the case of anti-ship use, the key requirement was to resolve the line between the ship and the water, and with 224 lines this became difficult. This was solved by turning the tube sideways so it had 220 lines of horizontal resolution and an analog signal of much greater resolution vertically.

In testing carried out by the Deutsche Forschungsanstalt für Segelflug (DFS) starting in 1943, they found one major advantage of the system was that it worked very well with the 2-axis control system on the missile. The Kehl control system used a control stick that started or stopped the motion of the aerodynamic controls on the bomb. Moving the controls to the left, for example, would move the controls to begin a left roll, but when the stick was centred it left the controls in that position and the roll continued to increase. Not being able to see the control surfaces after launch, the operators had to wait until they could see the bomb begin to move and then use opposite inputs to stop the motion. This caused them to continually overshoot their corrections. But when viewed through the television screen, the motion was immediately obvious and the operators had no problem making small corrections with ease.

However, they also found that some launches made for very difficult control. During the approach, the operator naturally stopped the control inputs as soon as the camera was lined up with the target. If the camera was firmly attached to the missile, this happened as soon as enough control was input. Critically, the missile might be pointed in that direction but not actually travelling in that direction, there was normally some angle of attack in the motion. This would cause the image to once again begin trailing the target, requiring another correction, and so on. If the launch was too far behind the target, the operator eventually ran out of control power as the missile approached, leading to a circular error probable (CEP) of 16 m (52 ft), too far to be useful.

After considering several possibilities to solve this, including a proportional navigation system, they settled on an extremely simple solution. Small wind vanes on the nose of the missile were used to rotate the camera so it was always pointed in the direction of the flight path, not the missile body. Now when the operator maneuvered the missile, he saw where it was ultimately headed, not where it was pointed at that instant. This also helped reduce the motion of the image if they applied sharp control inputs.

Another problem they found was that as the missile approached the target, corrections in the control system produced ever wilder motion on the television display, making last-minute corrections very difficult despite this being the most important part of the approach. This was addressed by training the controllers to ensure they had taken any last-minute corrections before this point, and then hold the stick in whatever position it was once the image grew to a certain size.

Sources claim that 255 D models were built in total, and one claims one hit a Royal Navy ship in combat. However, other sources suggest the system was never used in combat.

=== US efforts ===
The US had been introduced to the glide bombing concept by the Royal Air Force just before the US entered into the war. "Hap" Arnold had Wright Patterson Air Force Base begin the development of a wide variety of concepts under the GB ("glide bomb") and related VB ("vertical bomb") programs. These were initially of low importance, as both the Army Air Force and US Navy were convinced that the Norden bombsight would offer pinpoint accuracy and eliminate the need for guided bombs. It was not long after the first missions by the 8th Air Force in 1942 that the promise of the Norden was replaced by the reality that accuracy under 900 metres (1,000 yd) was essentially a matter of luck. Shortly thereafter the Navy came under attack by the early German MCLOS weapons in 1943. Both services began programs to put guided weapons into service as soon as possible, a number of these projects selected TV guidance.

RCA, then a world leader in television technology, had been experimenting with military television systems for some time at this point. As part of this, they had developed a miniaturized iconoscope, model 1846, suitable for use in aircraft. In 1941 these were experimentally used to fly drone aircraft and in April 1942 one of these was flown into a ship about 50 kilometres (31 mi) away. The US Army Air Force ordered a version of their GB-1 glide bomb to be equipped with this system, which became the GB-4. It was similar to the Hs 293D in almost every way. The Army's Signal Corps used the 1846 with their own transmitter and receiver system to produce an interlaced video display with 650 lines of resolution at 20 frames a second (40 fields a second). A film recorder was developed to allow post-launch critique.

Two B-17's were fit with the receivers and the first five test drops were carried out in July 1943 at Eglin Field in Florida. Further testing was carried out at the Tonopah Test Range and was increasingly successful. By 1944 the system was considered developed enough to attempt combat testing, and the two launch aircraft and a small number of GB-4 bombs were sent to England in June. These launches did not go well, with the cameras generally not working at all, failing just after launch, or offering intermittent reception that generally resulted in the images becoming visible only after the bomb had passed its target. After a series of failed launches, the team returned home, having lost one of the launch aircraft in a landing accident. Attempts to use the system to produce an air-to-air missile using command guidance failed due to issues with closing speed and reaction time.

By the end of the war, advances in tube miniaturization, especially as part of the development of the proximity fuse, allowed the iconoscope to be greatly reduced in size. However, RCA's continued research by this time had led to the development of the greatly improved image orthicon, and began Project MIMO, short for "Miniature Image Orthicon". The result was a dramatically smaller system that easily fit in the nose of a bomb. The Army's Air Technical Services Command used this in their VB-10 "Roc II" guided bomb project, a large vertically dropped bomb. Roc development began in early 1945 and was being readied for testing at Wendover Field when the war ended. Development continued after the war, and it was in the inventory for a time in the post-war period.

=== Blue Boar and Green Cheese ===
In the immediate post-war era, the Royal Navy developed a requirement for a guided bomb for the anti-shipping role. This emerged as the "Blue Boar", a randomly assigned rainbow code name. The system was designed to glide at an angle of about 40 degrees above the horizon and could be manoeuvred throughout the approach, to allow it to be directed onto a target within six seconds of breaking through cloud cover at 10,000 ft (3,000 m). An even larger "Special Blue Boar" developed with a 20,000 pounds (9,100 kg) payload, intended to deliver nuclear warheads from the V-bombers at range as much as 25 nautical miles (46 km; 29 mi) when dropped from 50,000 ft (15,000 m) altitude.

Ordered in 1951, development using an EMI television camera went smoothly and live testing began in 1953. Although successful, the program was cancelled in 1954 as the naval version grew too heavy to be carried by their new strike aircraft, while the V-bombers were slated to receive the much higher performance Blue Steel.

The anti-shipping role was unfilled and led to a second project, "Green Cheese". This was largely identical to Blue Boar with the addition of several solid fuel rockets to allow it to be launched from low altitude and fly to the target without exposing the launch aircraft to fire, while also replacing the television camera with a small radar. This too proved too heavy for its intended aircraft, the Fairey Gannet, and was cancelled in 1956.

=== Martel ===
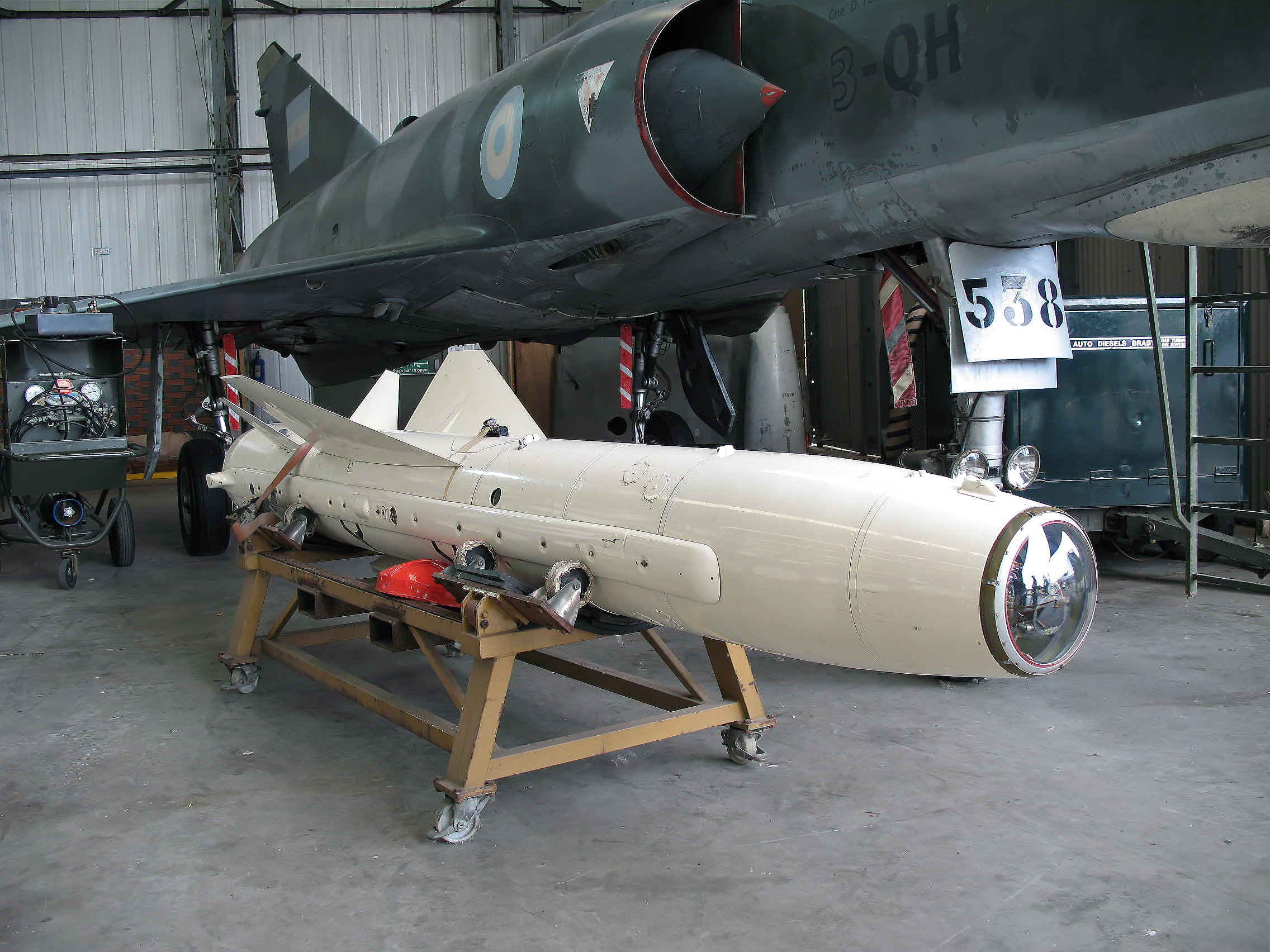
The AJ.168 Martel was the Royal Navy's primary naval strike weapon on their Buccaneer fleet in the 1970s and 80s.

In the early 1960s, Matra and Hawker Siddeley Dynamics began to collaborate on a long-range high-power anti-radar missile known as Martel. The idea behind Martel was to allow an aircraft to attack Warsaw Pact surface-to-air missile sites while well outside their range, and it carried a warhead large enough to destroy the radar even in the case of a near miss. In comparison to the US AGM-45 Shrike, Martel was far longer ranged, up to 60 kilometres (37 mi) compared to 16 kilometres (10 mi) for the early Shrike, and mounted a 150-kilogram (330 lb) warhead instead of 66 kilograms (145 lb).

Shortly thereafter, the Royal Navy began to grow concerned about the improving air defense capabilities of Soviet ships. The Blackburn Buccaneer had been designed specifically to counter these ships by flying at very low altitudes and dropping bombs from long distances and high speeds. This approach kept the aircraft under the ship's radar until the last few minutes of the approach, but by the mid-1960s it was felt even this brief period would open the aircraft to attack. A new weapon was desired that would keep the aircraft even further from the ships, ideally never rising above the radar horizon.

This meant that the missile would have to be fired blind, while the aircraft's own radar was unable to see the target. At the time there was no indigenous active radar seeker available so the decision was made to use television guidance and data link system to send the video to the launch aircraft. The Martel airframe was considered suitable, and a new nose section with the electronics was added to create the AJ.168 version.

Like the earlier German and US weapons, the Martel required the weapon officer to guide the missile visually while the pilot steered the aircraft away from the target. Unlike the earlier weapons, Martel flew its initial course using an autopilot that flew the missile high enough that it could see both the target and the launch aircraft so the data link could operate. The television signal would not turn on until the missile reached the approximate midpoint, at which point the weapons officer guided it like the earlier weapons. Although this required the missile to fly high enough to be visible to the ship, its small size made it an elusive target for radars of that era and especially weapons. Martel was not a sea-skimming missile and instead dove on the target from some altitude.

The first test launch of the AJ.168 took place in February 1970 and a total of 25 were fired by the time testing ended in July 1973, mostly at RAF Aberporth in Wales. Further testing was carried out until October 1975, when it was cleared for service. It was used only briefly by the Royal Navy before they turned the remainder of their Buccaneers over to the RAF. The RAF used both the anti-radar and anti-ship versions on their Buccaneers, with the anti-ship versions being replaced by the Sea Eagle in 1988, while the original AS.37 anti-radar versions remained in use until the Buccaneers were retired in March 1994.

=== Walleye ===
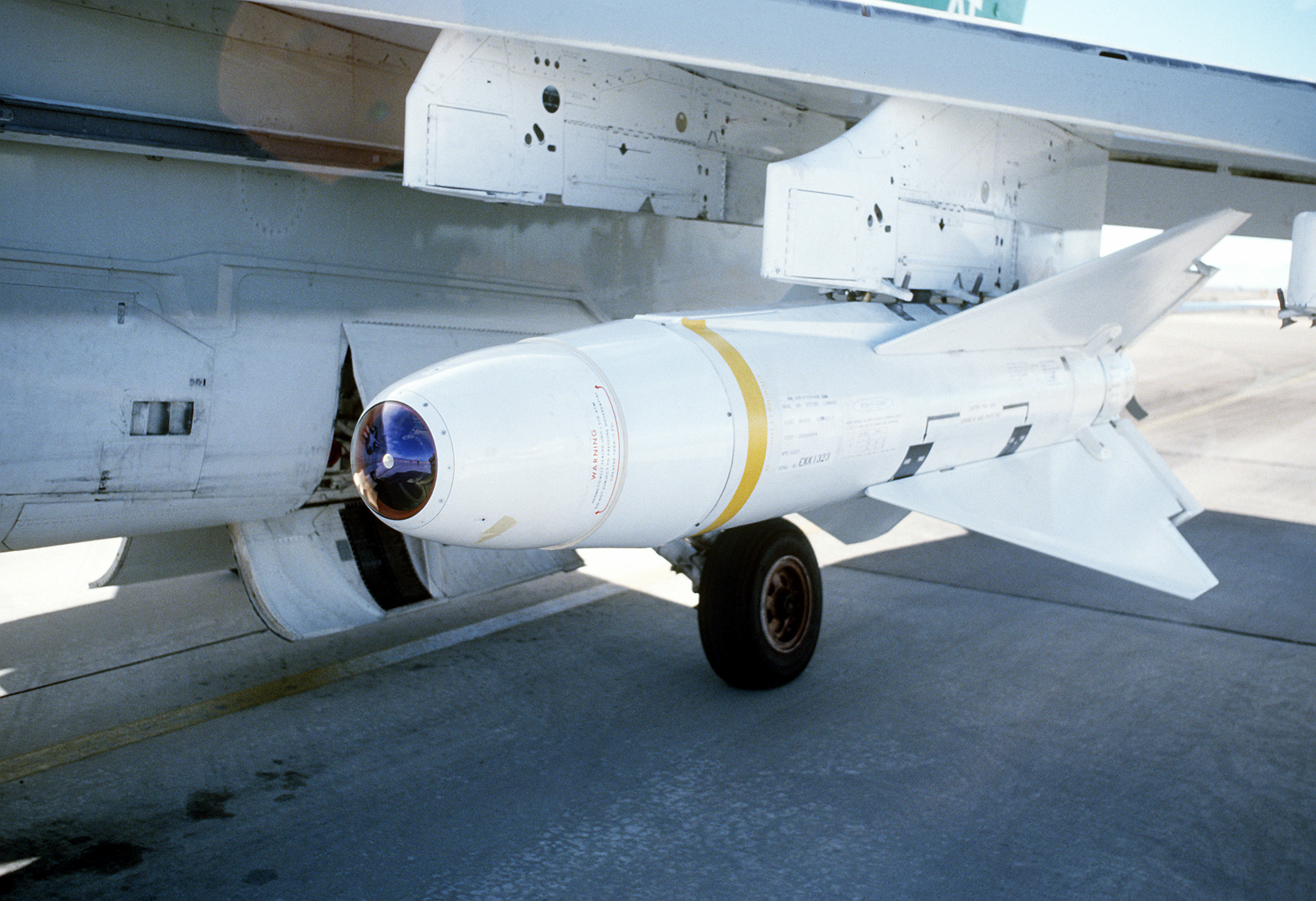
The original Walleye looked more like a missile than a bomb. It was a primary weapon of the A-7 Corsair II.

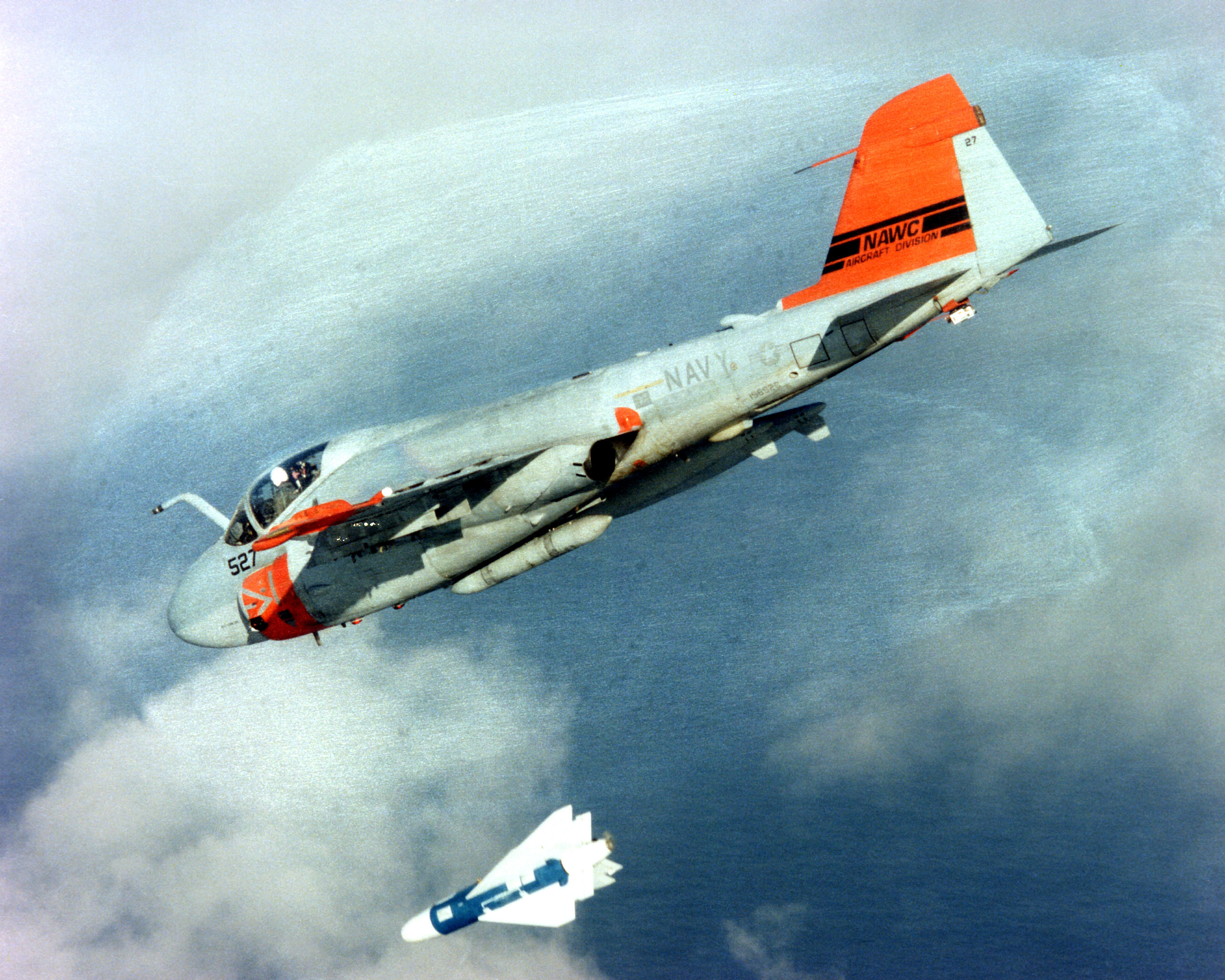
Walleye II had a larger warhead, much larger wings, and an extended range data link.

US interest in television guidance largely ended in the post-war period. Nevertheless, small-scale development continued, and a team at the Naval Ordnance Test Station (NOTS) developed a way to automatically track light or dark spots on a television image, a concept today known as an optical contrast seeker.

Most work focused on MACLOS weapons instead, and led to the development of the AGM-12 Bullpup which was considered to be so accurate it was referred to as a "silver bullet". Early use of the Bullpup demonstrated that it was too difficult to use and exposed the launch aircraft to anti-aircraft fire, precisely the same problems that led the Germans to begin TV guidance research. In January 1963, NOTS released a contract for a bomb and guidance system that could be used with their contrast tracker. Despite being a glide bomb, this was confusingly assigned a number as part of the new guided-missile numbering system, becoming the AGM-62 Walleye.

As initially envisioned, the system would use a television only while the missile was still on the aircraft, and would automatically seek once launched. This quickly proved infeasible, as the system would often break lock for a wide variety of reasons. This led to the addition of a data link that sent the image back to the aircraft, allowing guidance throughout. This was not a true television guidance system in the classic sense, as the operator's task was to continue selecting points of high contrast which the seeker would then follow. In practice, however, the updating was almost continuous, and the system acted more like a television guidance system and autopilot, like the early plans for the Hs 293.

Walleye entered service in 1966 and was quickly used in several precision attacks against bridges and similar targets. These revealed that it did not have enough striking power, and more range was desired. This led to the introduction of an extended range data link (ERDL) and larger wings to extend range from 30 to 44 kilometres (18 to 28 mi). Walleye II was a much larger version based on a 910-kilogram (2,000 lb) bomb to improve performance against large targets like bridges, and further extended range to as much as 59 kilometres (37 mi). These were widely used in the later portions of the war and they remained in service through the 1970s and 80s. It was an ERDL equipped Walleye that was used to destroy the oil pipes feeding Sea Island and help stop the Gulf War oil spill in 1991. Walleye left service in the 1990s, replaced largely by laser-guided weapons.

=== Kh-59 ===
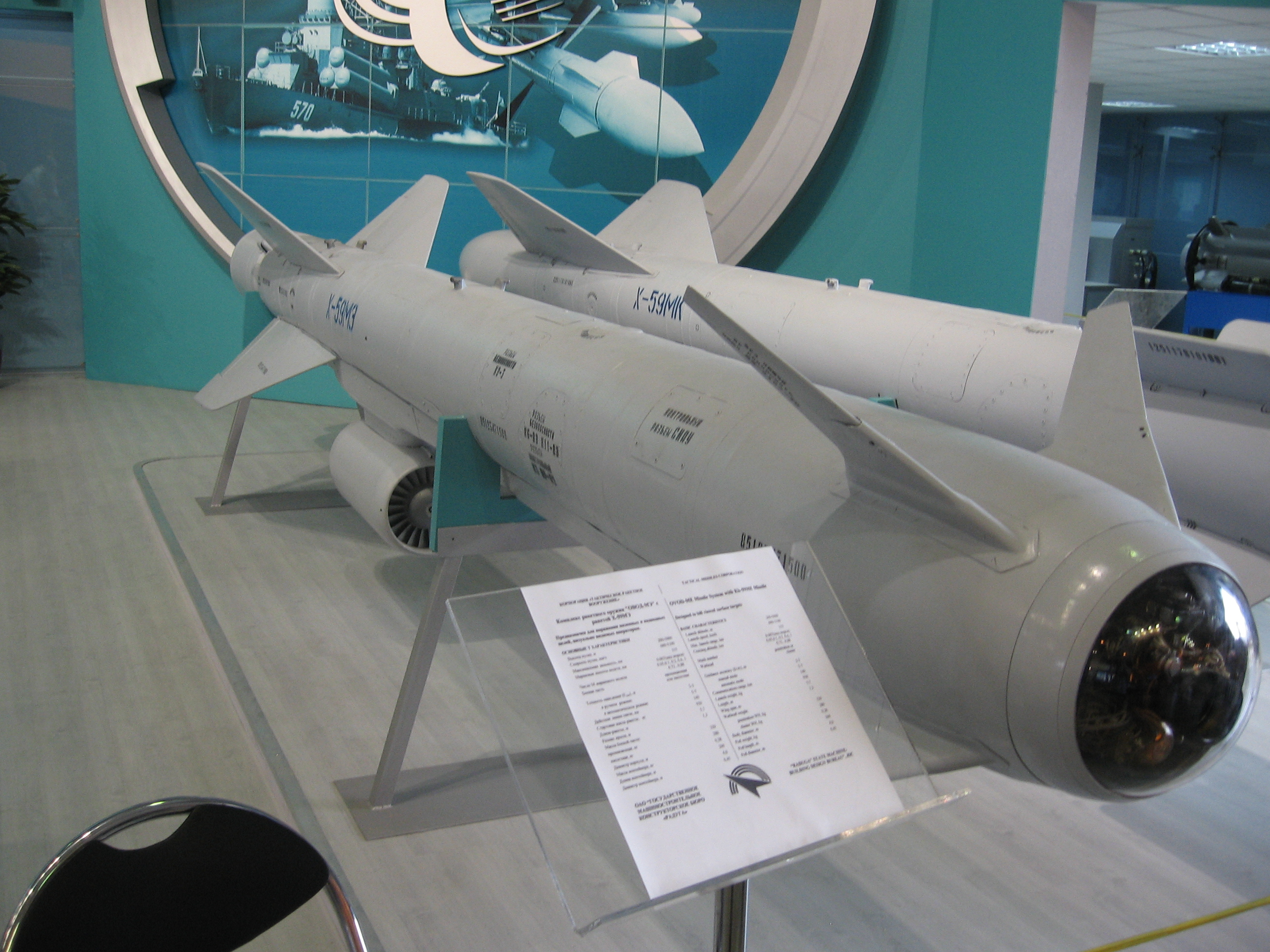
Kh-59Me is the television guided version of the Kh-59 land-attack missile.

The Soviet Kh-59 is a long-range land attack missile that turns on its television camera after 10 kilometres (6 mi) of travel from the launch aircraft. It has a maximum range of 200 kilometres (120 mi), and is used in a fashion essentially identical to that of the Walleye.

== See also ==
- Manual command to line of sight
