= Mark 118 bomb =

M118 Demolition Bomb
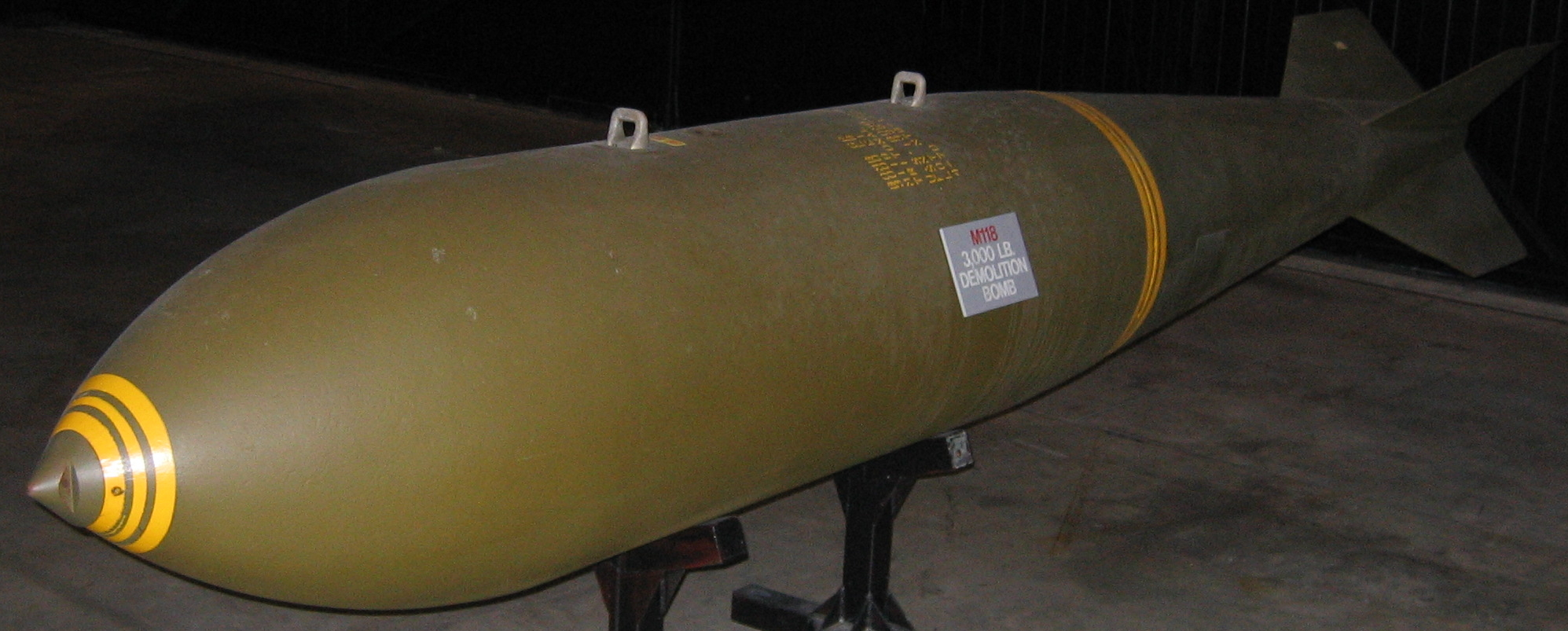
- M118 displayed at the National Museum of the United States Air Force, Dayton, Ohio
- Type: Demolition bomb, free-fall general-purpose bomb
- Place of origin: United States

Service history
- In service: 1950s–present
- Used by: United States
- Wars: Korean War, Vietnam War

Specifications
- Mass: 3,000 pounds (1,400 kg)
- Maximum firing range: Varies by method of employment
- Warhead: Tritonal
- Warhead weight: 1,975 pounds (896 kg)

The M118 is an air-dropped general-purpose or demolition bomb used by United States military forces. It dates back to the time of the Korean War of the early 1950s. Although it has a nominal weight of 3,000 pounds (1,400 kg), its actual weight, depending on fuse and retardation options, is somewhat higher. A typical non-retarded configuration has a total weight of 3,049 pounds (1,383 kg) with an explosive content of 1,975 pounds (896 kg) of tritonal. This is a much higher percentage than in the more recent American Mark 80 series bombs thus the designation as a demolition bomb.

In the late 1950s through the early 1970s it was a standard aircraft weapon, carried by the F-100 Super Sabre, F-111 Aardvark, F-104 Starfighter, F-105 Thunderchief, and F-4 Phantom. Some apparently remain in the USAF inventory, although they are rarely used today.

It was a component of the GBU-9/B version of the Rockwell electro-optically guided Homing Bomb System (HOBOS). This weapon consisted of an M118 fitted with a KMU-390/B guidance kit with an image contrast seeker, strakes and cruciform tail fins to guide the bomb to its target. It was also used in the Texas Instruments Paveway series of laser-guided bombs as the GBU-11 when it was fitted with the KMU-370B/B seeker head, MAU-157 Computer Control Group and the MXU-602 Airfoil Group. This latter consisted of four fixed cruciform fins and four moveable canards to control the bomb's trajectory. It was also fitted with an AIM-9B Sidewinder infra-red seeker and an AGM-45 Shrike nose cone during 1967 tests at the Naval Ordnance Test Station China Lake, possibly in an attempt to create an infra-red guided bomb. This was called the Bombwinder.

15 of these M118 Paveway Is were evaluated between 15 October and 9 November 1969.
