= AAM-N-5 Meteor =

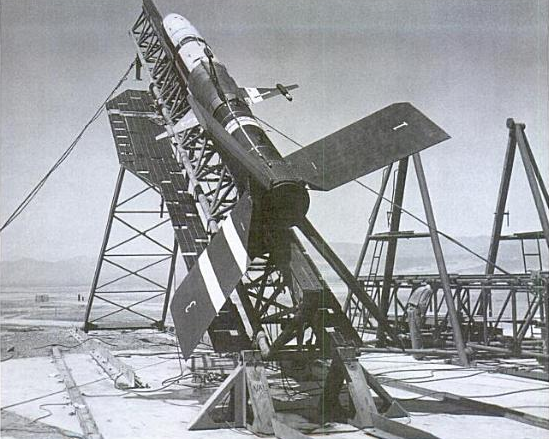
- Type: Air-to-air missile
- Place of origin: United States

Service history
- In service: 1948-1953
- Used by: United States Navy

Production history
- Designer: Massachusetts Institute of Technology
- Designed: 1945-1946
- Manufacturer: Bell Aircraft

Specifications
- Mass: 580 pounds (260 kg)
- Length: 13 feet 11.25 inches (4.25 m)
- length: 9 feet 6 inches (2.90 m) w/out booster
- Diameter: 8.9 inches (230 mm)
- Wingspan: 3 ft 2.8 in (0.986 m)
- Warhead: High explosive
- Warhead weight: 25 pounds (11 kg)
- Engine: Liquid-fuel rocket Booster: Solid-fuel rocket
- Operational range: 25 miles (40 km)
- Flight altitude: Max at launch, 10 miles (16 km)
- Maximum speed: Mach 2+
- Guidance system: Semi-active radar homing

The AAM-N-5 Meteor was an early American air-to-air missile, developed by the Massachusetts Institute of Technology and Bell Aircraft for the United States Navy. Initially, both air-launched and ship-launched versions were considered. Versions designed for launch from carrier-based aircraft proceeded to the flight testing stage before the project was cancelled.

In 1950, the Royal Navy expressed some interest in adapting Meteor as a short-range missile to defend ships against glide bombs and similar weapons. They had been studying this concept under their Popsy project and called the adapted Meteor "Mopsy". When the US Navy abandoned their interest in a ship-launched version, Mopsy went no further.

== Development ==
Development of the Meteor was loosely defined at first, with both surface-to-air and air-to-air missiles being studied by the Massachusetts Institute of Technology under a contract awarded in November 1945 by the U.S. Navy's Bureau of Ordnance; the decision was made to construct the air-to-air version for testing, with construction of the airframe being assigned to Bell Aircraft.

As built, the AAM-N-5 Meteor was a two-stage missile, utilizing semi-active radar homing; the first stage consisted of a solid-fueled rocket booster, with the main sustainer stage utilizing liquid fuels. It had a range of 25 miles (40 km), and reached speeds of over Mach 2, with some sources claiming a top speed of Mach 3. Control was provided by cruciform fins.

Flight testing of the AAM-N-5 began in July 1948 at the Naval Ordnance Test Station, with Douglas JD-1 Invader utility aircraft acting as the launching platform. Starting in 1951, test launches were conducted using Douglas F3D Skyknight nightfighters as carrier aircraft; fifteen launches were also made from ground launchers at NOTS' China Lake range. However, in 1953 the program was cancelled, as better missiles were becoming available.

In 1950, a group from the Royal Navy met with the Meteor team at MIT while looking for solutions to their Popsy requirement. Having faced German guided bombs like Fritz-X during World War II, Popsy called for a small missile that could attack these weapons at close range. Meteor had the required performance, but lacked the ability to be used against low-level targets due to its wide-beam radar system, which would result in signal bouncing off waves when aimed near the horizon and confusing the seeker. The group managed to convince MIT of the need for a narrow beam guidance system and called the result "Mopsy". However, the US Navy lost interest in using Meteor as a ship-launched weapon, and nothing further came of this effort.

An advanced version of Meteor, Meteor II, was assigned to be built by United Aircraft; it was intended to have a solid-fueled booster rocket with a ramjet sustainer stage, but was not built.
