= Green Cheese (missile) =

British anti-shipping missile design

- Type: Guided missile
- Place of origin: UK

Production history
- Manufacturer: Fairey Aviation
- Produced: cancelled 1956

Specifications
- Mass: 3,800 lb (1,700 kg)
- Launch platform: Fairey Gannet (proposed)

Fairey's Green Cheese, a rainbow codename, was a British-made radar-guided anti-ship missile project of the 1950s. It was a development of the earlier and much larger Blue Boar television guided glide bomb, making it smaller, replacing the television camera with the radar seeker from the Red Dean air-to-air missile, and carrying a smaller warhead of 1,700 pounds (770 kg).

Green Cheese arose as part of the 'Sverdlov crisis', when the Royal Navy were concerned over the appearance of a new Soviet heavy cruiser class. Green Cheese was a longer-ranged and guided replacement for the unguided Red Angel, which had required an approach by the attacker too close to the target to be considered survivable. Green Cheese was initially unpowered, but during development the range requirement could not be met and a small rocket motor was added to improve this. This also increased the weight to 3,800 pounds (1,700 kg) from the planned 3,300 pounds (1,500 kg).

Green Cheese was intended to arm two aircraft, the Fairey Gannet, and the still-under-development Blackburn Buccaneer. The rising weight made it too heavy for the existing Gannets, and the Buccaneer had enough performance to directly attack the ships with conventional bombs, at least in the short term. Green Cheese was cancelled in 1956 (Note: Friedman says it was cancelled in 1957.) and development of an even more powerful design for Buccaneer began.

== Development ==
=== Previous systems ===
One of the earliest responses to the Sverdlov was the Red Angel anti-shipping rocket, essentially a greatly enlarged version of the armour-piercing RP-3 used during World War II. The intended aircraft was the Westland Wyvern strike aircraft, but as development dragged on, plans to replace the Wyvern with a jet-powered design, NA.39, were advancing. This would leave a gap where the Wyvern would be removed and the jet not yet introduced. To fill this gap, the Fairey Gannet was selected, a much larger and slower aircraft than the Wyvern. It was felt that Red Angel's range would not be enough to keep the Gannet safe from the Sverdlov-class' ship-board guns.

=== Longer range ===
Through this same period, the Royal Air Force and Vickers had been developing a large television guided glide bomb, Blue Boar. This system was overtaken by other developments, and ultimately cancelled in 1956. However, a smaller development under OR.1127 was already being considered as an anti-shipping weapon. This would be launched in large numbers from the Vickers Valiant while flying at high altitude, around 50,000 feet (15,000 m), far beyond the range of the ship's guns. In 1954, the Navy released AW.319, calling for a smaller version that could be launched from the Gannet, and later, the NA.39 aircraft. This was assigned the name Green Cheese.

For the Gannet, it was envisioned the aircraft would drop Green Cheese from around 10,000 feet (3,000 m) altitude, with a required range of 10,000 yards (9,100 m). The original Blue Boar design had relatively high drag as it was designed to fall at a fairly steep angle around 45 degrees, giving it perhaps 3,000 yards (2,700 m) range from this altitude. For this reason, the wings were redesigned to have lower drag. The Valiant would drop it from high altitudes which would give it prodigious range, but this was limited in practice to the 20,000 yards (18,000 m) range of the radar seeker being used, which was adapted from the Vickers Red Dean air-to-air missile. Fairey Aviation won the contract with their Fairey Project 7.

The weapon would be produced in two versions, one with fixed wings to be carried externally on the Valiant and designed to hit the ships above the waterline, and a second with flip-out fins for the Gannet and NA.39, designed to hit the ship under the waterline as with the earlier rockets. To do this, the missile would hit the water about 150 feet (46 m) short of the target. The radome was designed to crush on impact with the water and expose an angled section that caused it to curve up and travel horizontally through the water. Arranging this to occur proved more difficult than initially imagined and was ultimately abandoned in favour of the traditional warhead from the Valiant version.

In testing, the glide performance even with the new wings proved to be too small to reach the desired range. The initial idea was the add a tapered tail to reduce drag, but this led to less internal room for the electronics, which were in the tail. Instead, they added a small rocket motor, a short section of the Smokey Joe motor from the Thunderbird surface-to-air missile, giving it the desired 30 degree flight path.

=== Moving to Buccaneer ===
These changes also had the side effect of raising the weight from the desired 3,300 pounds (1,500 kg) to an estimated 3,800 pounds (1,700 kg), too heavy for the Gannet. There was also the issue that the radar seeker needed to be able to see forward prior to launch, which would require the missile to be extended below the aircraft. This was not an issue on the upcoming NA.39, but was on the Gannet where the propeller blocked the forward view and required some sort of new system to properly expose it. Eventually the decision to use Green Cheese on Gannet was abandoned, and it was moved entirely to NA.39, soon to be known as the Blackburn Buccaneer.

Moving to the new aircraft had the significant advantage that the aircraft's own targeting radar could be used to feed initial information to the missile, meaning that the missile would not have to be exposed prior to launch. There was also some consideration of using the aircraft's radar in a semi-automatic fashion, thereby simplifying the radar on the missile, but this was abandoned as it was felt it would make the aircraft too visible. This was not a problem on Valiant, as the missiles were carried externally and would always be able to see the target.

By March 1955 it was clear the project was in trouble, and it was officially cancelled in 1956 due in part to cost over-runs. By this point it had a reached a stage called Cockburn Cheese, after the British military scientist Dr. Robert Cockburn. It was replaced with the Green Flash project, armed with the Red Beard warhead. This too was cancelled and the idea of a tactical nuclear-tipped guided missile for anti-shipping use was given up in favour of a simple "lobbed" tactical nuclear bomb, the WE.177A.
