= Blue Steel (missile) =

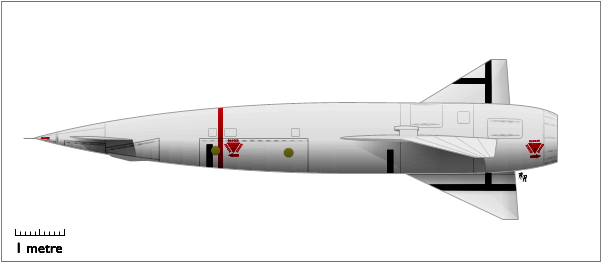
- Blue Steel missile
- Type: Nuclear stand-off air-launched cruise missile
- Place of origin: United Kingdom

Service history
- In service: 1963-1970
- Used by: Royal Air Force

Production history
- Manufacturer: Avro
- No. built: 53 operational live rounds
- Variants: One/mod for low-level delivery

Specifications
- Mass: 17,000 lb (7,700 kg)
- Length: 34 ft 11 in (10.64 m)
- Diameter: 1.22 m (48 in) minimum
- Wingspan: 12 ft 11 in (3.94 m)
- Warhead: Red Snow thermonuclear weapon
- Blast yield: 1.1 megaton
- Engine: Armstrong Siddeley Stentor; 20,000 lbf (89 kN)
- Propellant: hydrogen peroxide with kerosene
- Operational range: 926 km (575 mi)
- Flight ceiling: 21,500 m (70,500 ft)
- Maximum speed: Mach 3+
- Guidance system: Inertial navigation system
- Steering system: Movable flight control surfaces
- Launch platform: Aircraft

The Avro Blue Steel was a British air-launched, rocket-propelled nuclear armed standoff missile, built to arm the V bomber force. It allowed the bomber to launch the missile against its target while still outside the range of surface-to-air missiles (SAMs). The missile proceeded to the target at speeds up to Mach 3, and would trigger within 100 m of the pre-defined target point.

Blue Steel entered service in 1963, by which point improved SAMs with longer range had greatly eroded the advantages of the design. A longer-range version, Blue Steel II, was considered, but cancelled in favour of the much longer-range GAM-87 Skybolt system from the US. When development of that system was cancelled in 1962, the V-bomber fleet was considered highly vulnerable. Blue Steel remained the primary British nuclear deterrent weapon until the Royal Navy started operating Polaris ballistic missiles from Resolution-class submarines.

== Development ==
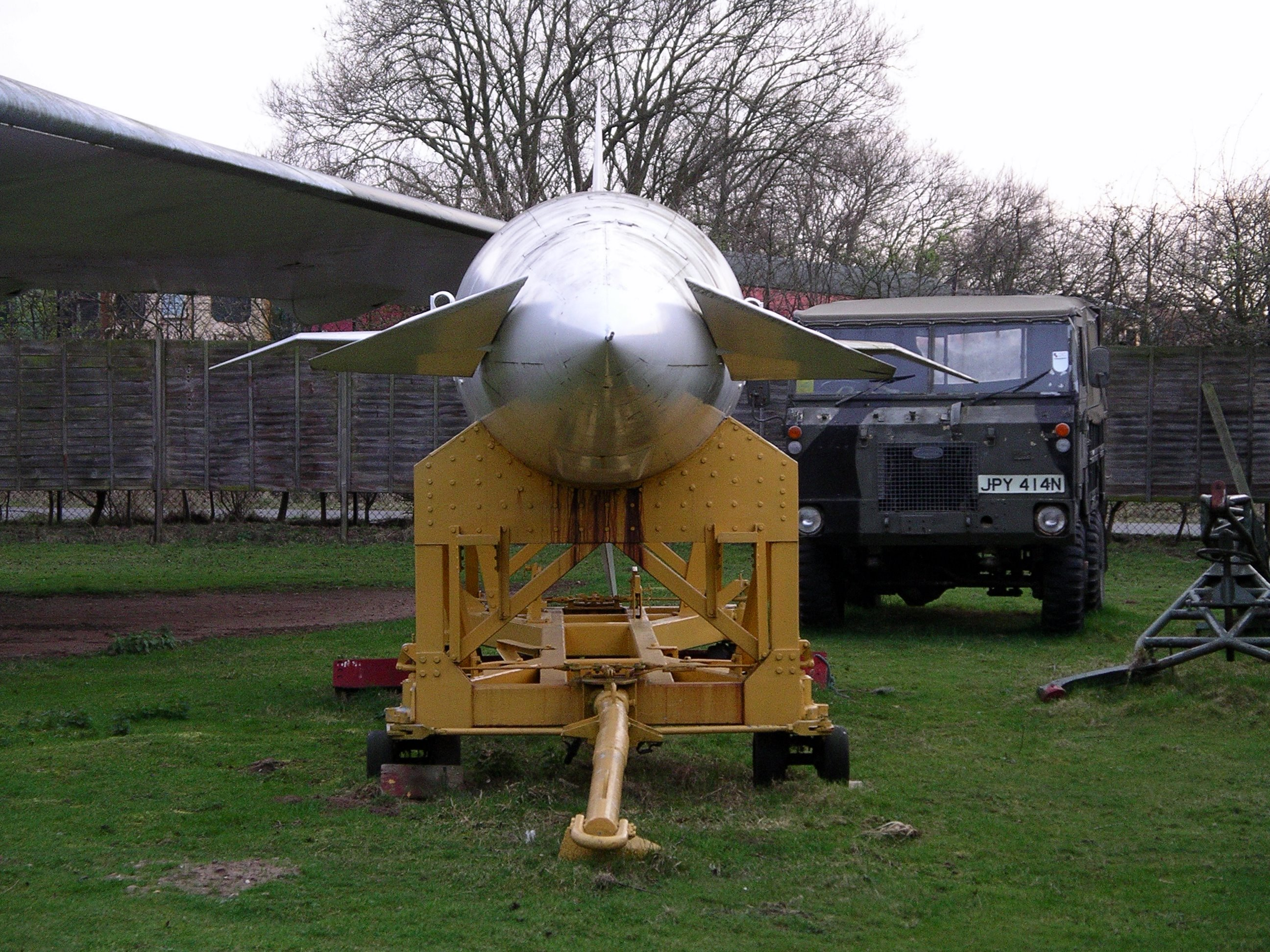
Avro Blue Steel nuclear missile (front) at the Midland Air Museum

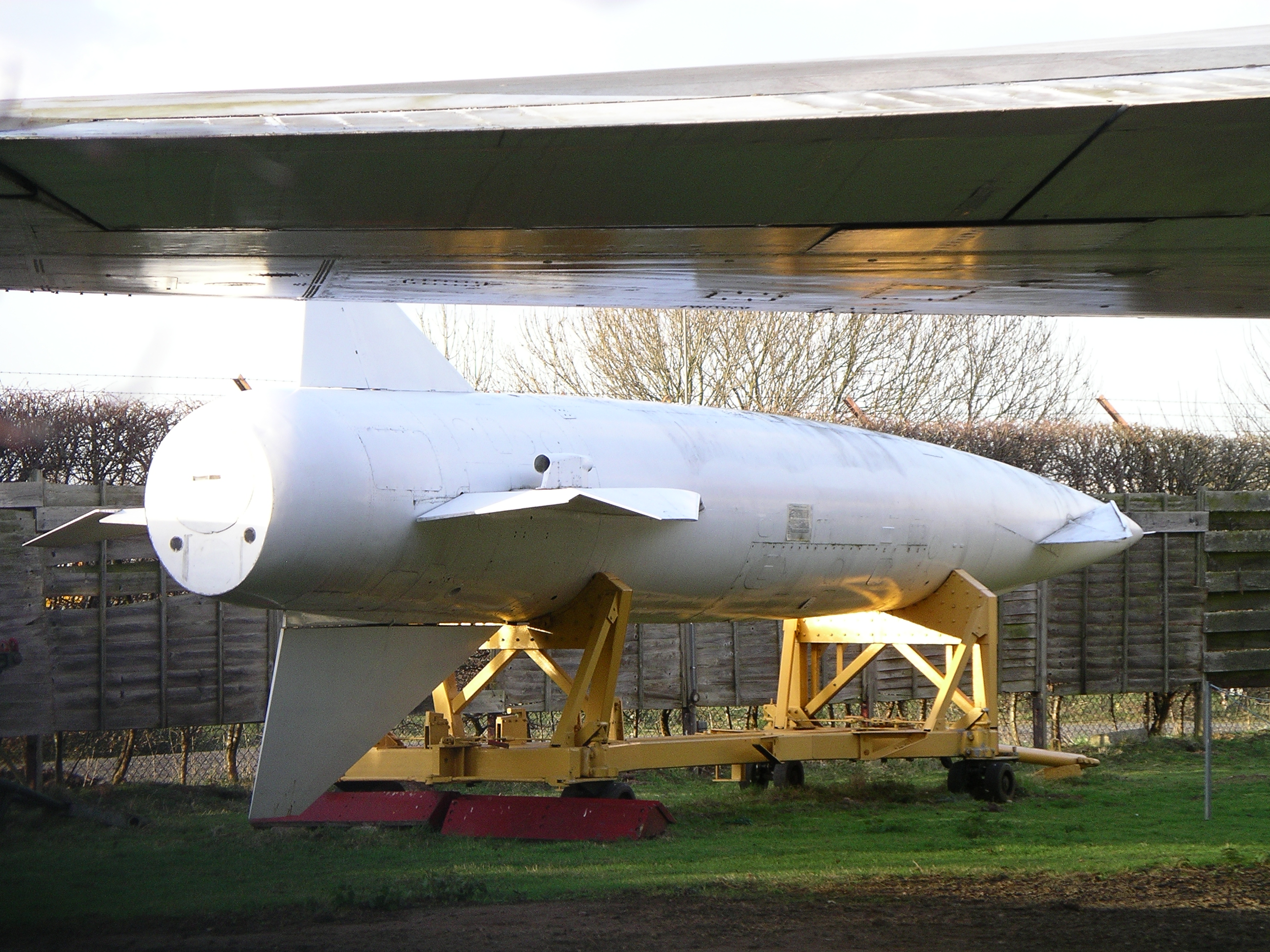
Avro Blue Steel missile (side view) at the Midland Air Museum behind the wing of an Avro Vulcan bomber

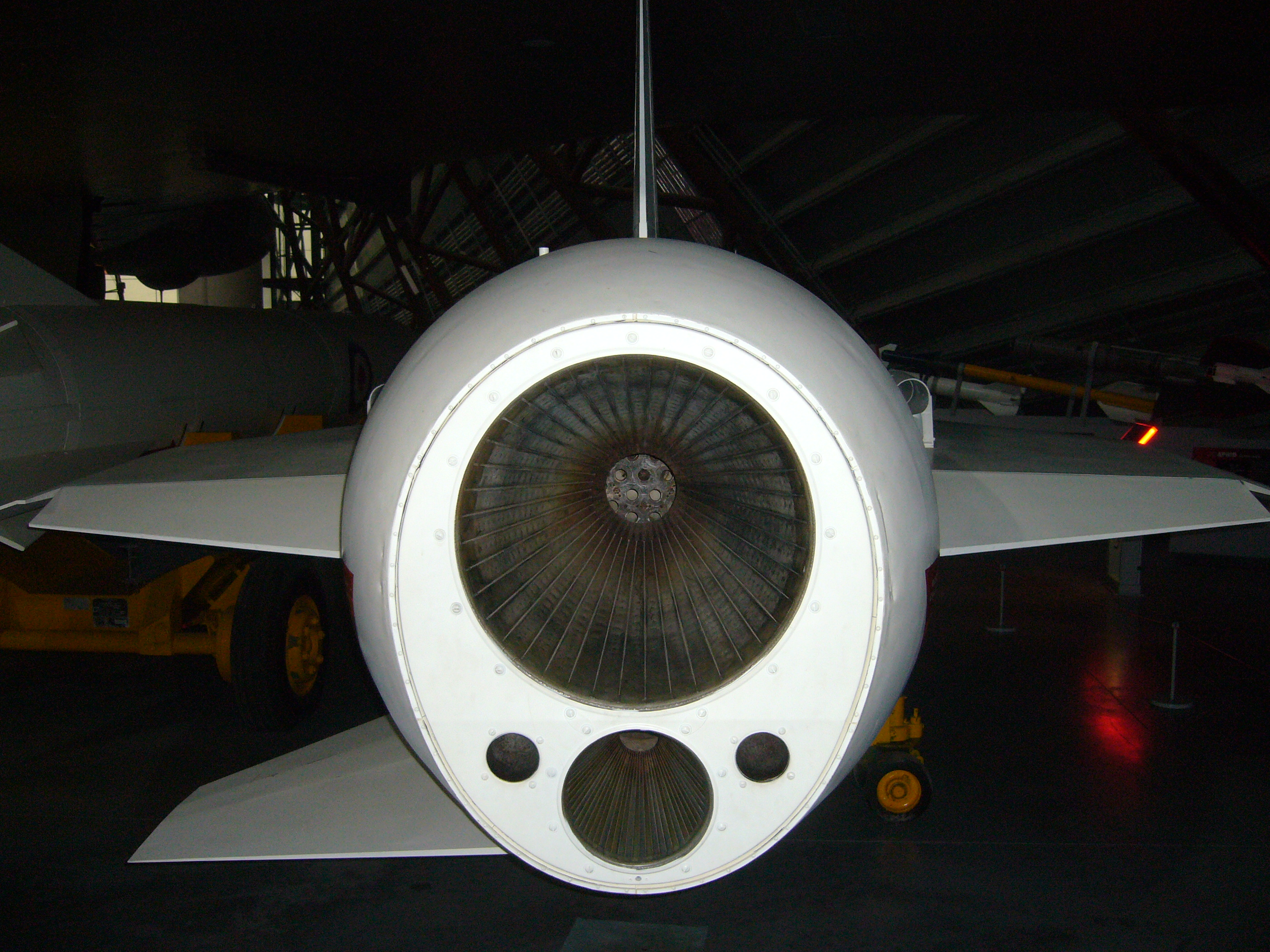
Rear view of Blue Steel missile at RAF Cosford aerospace museum, showing the twin-chamber "Stentor" rocket motor

=== Origins ===
During the early 1950s, the Soviet PVO-Strany interceptor aircraft and its associated ground controlled interception systems were steadily improving, making the approach to the V bomber's targets more difficult. An extensive study, "The Pattern of the Future Offensive", suggested that an attacking force of 100 aircraft would suffer 8% losses at night, and as much as 29% during the day due to the much greater number of day fighters in Soviet service. The paper concluded with a summary showing the expected losses over time as the Soviet forces improved, by 1957 it was expected that losses would be 10 to 20% at night, and then further erode.

The UK intelligence services were also aware that the Soviets were planning to deploy an extensive surface-to-air missile (SAM) system around Moscow. The system had been developed to fend off a WWII-style attack by 1,000 low-speed aircraft, like those raids carried out by RAF Bomber Command. Known in the west as the SA-1 "Guild", the system was partially based on World War 2 research in the German Wasserfall program and its V-300 missiles had limited range around 30 kilometres (19 mi) at best. Expected to be deployed in the late 1950s, approaching the target for attack with gravity bombs would become increasingly dangerous after that time.

At the time, the Soviet defences were at their best between 1,000 feet (300 m) and 40,000 feet (12,000 m), and the existing V-bombers had the required performance to fly above this altitude. But the introduction of the SAMs would make this increasingly unlikely to work as more and more of the missiles were installed. There were two general solutions to this problem. One was to fly higher and faster, but the leap in performance needed to overfly the missiles, with altitudes on the order of 70,000 feet (21 km) could not be met until the mid-1960s at the minimum. This would leave a gap between around 1961 and 1965 when the V-force could not be expected to successfully perform its mission.

The conclusion of this paper, and other reports like it, was that the situation could be greatly improved through the combination of improved electronic countermeasures (ECM) to disrupt fighter operations, and a standoff missile to allow the bombers to turn back before approaching within the range of the SAMs. It was expected that this combination would allow the V force to remain effective until 1965 at least. Beyond that time a new supersonic bomber would be required, a requirement that would ultimately be taken up as the Avro 730.

=== OR.1132 ===
On 3 September 1954 the Air Staff issued Operational Requirement OR.1132 for the standoff weapon. This was essentially issued to the Royal Aircraft Establishment (RAE), whose Guided Weapon Department had been studying such a system for a while and had produced a series of "W weapons" of different layouts. These had been designed to address the problem that the Atomic Weapons Research Establishment (AWRE) could not guarantee the size of the warhead. Accordingly, the W weapons were designed to the maximum possible size that each of the bombers could carry, 40 inches (1,000 mm) diameter for the Vickers Valiant and 50 inches (1,300 mm) for Avro Vulcan and Handley Page Victor.

The Ministry of Supply (MoS) did not feel that development should remain at the RAE, and had canvassed the bomber builders asking for comments on the RAE's concepts, considering both a shorter-range and longer-ranged weapon. Avro, having recently given the go-ahead on the 730, appeared cool on the long-range concept and was primarily interested in a short-range weapon of perhaps 100 miles (160 km) range, which would allow it to avoid the most heavily defended areas. Vickers Armstrong and Handley Page were much more interested in the longer-ranged weapons that would extend the life of their existing V bomber designs. Handley Page's concept rejected the MoS's shorter range and offered a design of 500 nautical miles (930 km; 580 mi) using ramjet power. However, the Ministry noted that the inertial navigation system (INS) being developed by Elliott Automation would not be accurate enough to fly this distance and hit its targets within the desired circular error probable (CEP).

Vickers, who had worked on the somewhat similar Blue Boar and Red Rapier projects would seem like the natural choice for the contract, and planned to have their weapon in operation two years earlier than the other teams. But the Ministry had a cold relationship with Vickers after their Red Dean efforts. Avro appears to have been selected due to a number of RAE personnel having been hired by the company to form their design department, the Weapons Research Division, including the Chief Engineer, R.H. Fransis. On 4 May 1955 the Ministry of Supply issued the G/Proj/6220/GW35A contract with Avro and assigned it the rainbow code "Blue Steel".

=== Avro's concept ===
At the time, nuclear weapon design was still in its early stages, and the intended weapon for the missile was a boosted fission weapon known as "Green Bamboo". To achieve the desired 1 MT yield, the implosion had to be extremely symmetrical, and this required a 72-point explosive system that led to the weapon being 45 inches (1,100 mm) in diameter and massing an estimated 4,500 pounds (2,000 kg). This weapon was secret and only the diameter and mass were revealed to prospective entrants. It was the large size of the warhead, and the resulting 48 inches (1,200 mm) diameter fuselage needed to carry it, that led Avro to the use of a rocket motor when most standoff weapons to that point were jet or ramjet powered. Avro simply could not find a place to put an air intake on the missile which did not result it in being too large in some other dimension, typically length. The engine, the Armstrong Siddeley Stentor Mark 101, had two chambers, one for cruising at about Mach 1, and a second larger one that was ignited close to the target to increase speed to Mach 3 for a final dash.

At Mach 3, skin friction will heat the fuselage to around 315 to 480 °C (599 to 896 °F), which is higher than the temperature that will cause aluminium to become soft. This is the reason that most high-speed aircraft are generally limited to about Mach 2.4 or lower, flying above this speed risks damage to the airframe. Those aircraft that do operate above this speed have to use other materials, and for this role, Avro chose stainless steel. The difficulties encountered bending sheets of stainless steel led to initial designs for the weapon that were very "linear", with the fuselage made of a single sheet rolled into a cylinder and a second sheet rolled into a cone to form the nose area.

Avro's initial response, in late 1955, outlined a four-stage development effort. In Stage 1, the 13,000 pounds (5,900 kg) weapon would be powered by a two-chamber rocket engine that would provide the required 100 nautical miles (190 km; 120 mi) range at speeds up to Mach 2.5. The 16,000 pounds (7,300 kg) Stage 2 would use an improved engine and more fuel to provide range up to 240 nautical miles (440 km; 280 mi) at speeds up to Mach 4.5. Stage 3 would weigh in at 25,000 pounds (11,000 kg) and include both disposible boosters and a drop-off fuel tank with range up to 450 nautical miles (830 km; 520 mi). For the future Avro 730, a new delta wing design of 18 to 26,000 lbs would offer range up to 900 nautical miles (1,700 km; 1,000 mi).

Considering their submissions, the Ministry responded by ordering Avro to work only on the OR.1137 requirements, and ignore the long-term developments. This produced the first complete design, W.100. They proposed building the missile from AF.520 stainless steel, expecting to learn how to do so using the 730 contract to build testbeds. A series of smaller designs, W.101 through 104, would be made from a variety of materials and used to test the flight dynamics, autopilot and INS. As part of ongoing industry-wide research, the design underwent several evolutionary changes. The wings and canards became deltas and the experience of the Bristol 188 gave Avro confidence in construction of rounded surfaces using stainless steel and the design became much more aerodynamic with a boat tail and ogive nose.

=== Delays ===
Avro began work proper in 1955, with the assigned Rainbow Code name of "Blue Steel" which it would keep in service. With Elliots working on the guidance system, Armstrong Siddeley would develop the liquid fuel engine. The design period was protracted, with various development problems exacerbated by the fact that designers lacked information on the actual size and weight of the proposed Green Bamboo, or its likely thermonuclear successor derived from the Granite series.

The program ran into delays almost immediately. All of the systems - missile, navigation and motor - ran into problems and this resulted in the companies pointing fingers at each other. By the late 1950s it was clear the missiles would not be ready for their 1962 initial operational introduction, leading to significant criticism of Avro on the part of the Ministry of Supply and the Air Ministry.

By this time it was clear that the Soviets were going to install an even more extensive missile system that originally believed, one that would cover the approach routes to the targets and even have sites on the Russian coastline, well outside the range of the missile.

Avro proposed that Blue Steel would evolve over time, subsequent versions increasing speed (to Mach 4.5) and range. The ultimate Blue Steel would be a 900 nmi (1,700 km) range weapon that could be launched by the supersonic Avro 730 under development. They were told to limit themselves to the specification of OR.1132. The project was delayed by the need to develop the required stainless steel fabrication techniques; this would have been gained in building the Avro 730 but that had been cancelled by then. The Elliots guidance system was plagued by accuracy problems, delaying test flights.

As it turned out, neither of the originally-proposed UK-designed warheads were actually fitted, being superseded by Red Snow, an Anglicised variant of the U.S. W-28 thermonuclear warhead of 1.1 Mt yield. Red Snow was smaller and lighter than the earlier warhead proposals. The missile was fitted with a state-of-the-art inertial navigation unit. This system allowed the missile to strike within 100 metres of its designated target. In addition, the pilots of the Avro Vulcan or Handley Page Victor bombers could tie their systems into those of the missile and make use of the guidance system to help plot their own flight plan, since the unit in the missile was more advanced than that in the aircraft.

On launch the rocket engine's first chamber developing 24,000 lbf (110 kN) thrust would power the missile along a predetermined course to the target at around Mach 1.5. Once close to the target, the second chamber of the engine (6,000 lbf) would accelerate the missile to Mach 3. Over the target the engine would cut out and the missile would free-fall before detonating its warhead as an air burst.

To speed the trials at Woomera, the test rounds were flown there by Victors and Vulcans in Operation Blue Ranger. The trials began in 1960 about the time the original requirement expected the weapon to be in service. The missiles were prepared at the Weapons Research Establishment near Salisbury, South Australia, and flown to be launched at the Woomera range from RAAF Base Edinburgh. A specialist unit, No. 4 Joint Services Trials Unit RAF, was established to carry out preparatory and operational tasks.

== In service ==
Blue Steel finally entered service in February 1963, carried by Vulcans and Victors, although its limitations were already apparent. The short range of the missile meant that the V bombers were still vulnerable to enemy surface-to-air missiles. A replacement for Blue Steel, the Mark 2, was planned with increased range and a ramjet engine, but had been cancelled in 1960 to minimize delays to the Mk.1. The UK sought to acquire the much longer-ranged United States AGM-48 Skybolt air-launched ballistic missile and was greatly frustrated when that weapon was cancelled in late 1962.

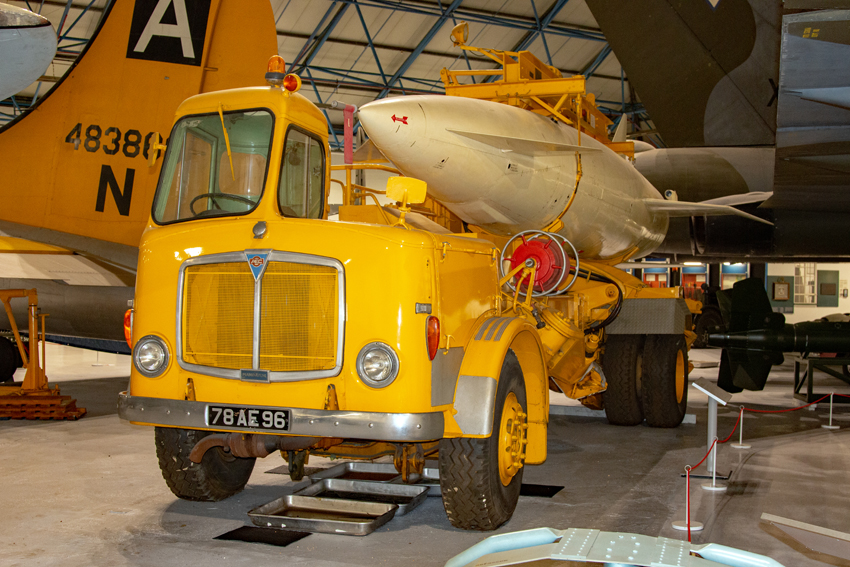
AEC Mandator Blue Steel tender at RAF Museum, Hendon

Blue Steel required up to seven hours of launch preparation, and was highly unreliable. The RAF estimated in 1963 that half the missiles would fail to fire and would have to be dropped over their targets, contradicting their purpose of serving as standoff weapons. Even as it deployed Blue Steel as a high-altitude weapon, that year the government decided that because of anti-aircraft missiles' increasing effectiveness, V bombers would have to convert from high-altitude to low-altitude attacks. These trials were conducted in 1964 and concluded in 1965 With no effective long-range weapon the original Blue Steel served on after a crash programme of minor modifications to permit a low-level launch at 1,000 ft (300 m), even though its usefulness in a hot war was likely limited. A stop-gap weapon (WE.177B) was quickly produced to extend the life of the V-bomber force in the strategic role until the Polaris missile was deployed. This WE.177 laydown weapon supplemented the remaining modified Blue Steel missiles, using a low-level penetration followed by a pop-up manoeuvre to release the weapon at 1,000 ft (300 m). One live operational round was deployed on each of forty-eight Vulcan and Victor bombers, and a further five live rounds were produced as operational spares. An additional four non-nuclear rounds were produced for various RAF requirements, and there were sixteen other unspecified training rounds.

Blue Steel was officially retired on 31 December 1970, with the United Kingdom's strategic nuclear capacity passing to the submarine fleet.

== Operator ==
United Kingdom

- Royal Air Force - (V bombers)

== Specifications ==
- Length: 10.7 m (35 ft)
- Wingspan: 4 m (13 ft)
- Diameter: 1.22 m (48 in) minimum
- Launch Weight: 7,270 lb (3,300 kg)
- Speed: Mach 2.3
- Ceiling: 21,500 m (70,500 ft)
- Maximum Range: 240 km (150 mi)
- Guidance: Inertial
- CEP: ~100 metres
- Warhead: Red Snow thermonuclear (1.1 Mt)

== See also ==
- AGM-28 Hound Dog – (United States)
- Kh-22 – (Soviet Union)
- Rainbow Codes
