= GBU-15 =

Glide bomb

- A GBU-15(V)21/B
- Type: Precision guided munition (PGM)
- Place of origin: United States

Service history
- In service: 1975–present
- Used by: USAF
- Wars: Operation Wooden Leg; Persian Gulf War

Production history
- Designer: Rockwell International
- Designed: 1970s
- Variants: GBU-15(V)1/B; GBU-15(V)21/B; GBU-15(V)22/B

Specifications
- Mass: 2450 lb (1111 kg)
- Length: 154 in (3.90 m)
- Diameter: 18.7 in (475 mm)
- Wingspan: 4 ft 11 in (1.5 m)
- Warhead weight: 2,000 lb (910 kg)
- Operational range: 5 to 15 nmi (9.3 to 27.8 km; 5.8 to 17.3 mi)
- Guidance system: Manual guidance by radio datalink with TV guidance or Infrared homing with Imaging Infra-red
- Steering system: Aerodynamic
- Launch platform: F-4 Phantom II; B-52 Stratofortress; F-111 Aardvark; F-15E Strike Eagle; F-16 Fighting Falcon

The Rockwell International GBU-15 is an unpowered glide weapon used to destroy high-value enemy targets. It was designed for use with F-15E Strike Eagle, F-111 'Aardvark' and F-4 Phantom II aircraft. The GBU-15 has long-range maritime anti-ship capability with the B-52 Stratofortress.

== Overview ==
The weapon consists of modular components that are attached to either a general purpose Mark 84 bomb or a penetrating-warhead BLU-109 bomb. Each weapon has five components—a forward guidance section, warhead adapter section, control module, airfoil components, and a weapon data link.

The guidance section is attached to the nose of the weapon and contains either a television guidance system for daytime or an imaging infrared system for night or limited, adverse weather operations. A data link in the tail section sends guidance updates to the control aircraft that enables the weapon systems operator to guide the bomb by remote control to its target.

An external electrical conduit extends the length of the warhead which attaches the guidance adapter and control unit. The conduit carries electrical signals between the guidance and control sections. The umbilical receptacle passes guidance and control data between cockpit control systems of the launching aircraft and the weapon prior to launch.

The rear control section consists of four wings that are in an "X"-like arrangement with trailing edge flap control surfaces for flight maneuvering. The control module contains the autopilot, which collects steering data from the guidance section and converts the information into signals that move the wing control surfaces to change the weapon's flight path.

== Uses ==
The GBU-15 may be used in either a direct or an indirect attack. In a direct attack, the pilot selects a target before launch, locks the weapon guidance system onto it and launches the weapon. The weapon automatically guides itself to the target, enabling the pilot to leave the area. In an indirect attack, the weapon is guided by remote control after launch. The pilot releases the weapon and, via remote control, searches for the target. Once the target is acquired, the weapon can be locked to the target or manually guided via the Hughes Aircraft AN/AXQ-14 data-link system.

This highly maneuverable weapon has an optimal, low-to-medium altitude delivery capability with pinpoint accuracy. It also has a standoff capability. During Desert Storm, all 71 GBU-15 modular glide bombs used were dropped from F-111F aircraft. Most notably, EGBU-15s were the munitions used for destroying the oil manifolds on the storage tanks to stop oil from spilling into the Persian Gulf. These EGBU-15s sealed flaming oil pipeline manifolds sabotaged by Saddam Hussein's troops.

The Air Force Development Test Center, Eglin Air Force Base, Florida, began developing the GBU-15 in 1974. The Air Force originally asked for the missile designations AGM-112A and AGM-112B for two versions of the system. This was declined because the weapon was an unpowered glide bomb and GBU designation was allotted instead. The M-112 designation remains unassigned as a result.

It was a product improvement of the early guided bomb used during the Vietnam War called the GBU-8 HOBOS. The GBU-8 could not be controlled after the bomb was released. Instead, the aircraft was forced to fly very close to the target so the WSO could acquire it. Once locked on, the weapon could be released and the aircraft could return to base.

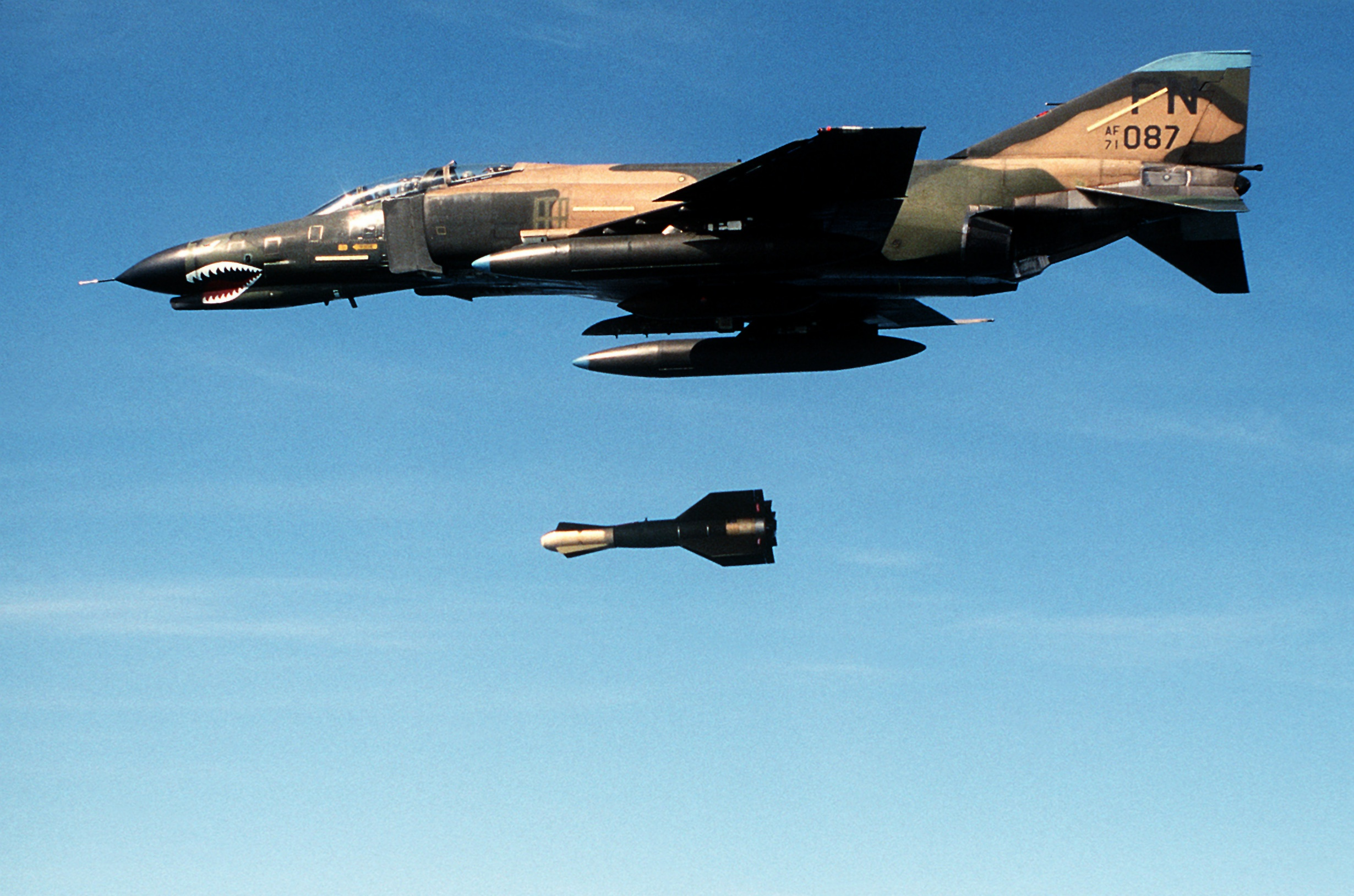
A 3rd TFW F-4E dropping a GBU-15(V)1/B, in 1985.

Flight testing of the weapon began in 1975. The GBU-15 with television guidance, completed full-scale operational test and evaluation in November 1983. In February 1985, initial operational test and evaluation was completed on the imaging infrared guidance seeker.

In December 1987, the program management responsibility for the GBU-15 weapon system transferred from the Air Force Systems Command to the Air Force Logistics Command. The commands merged to become the Air Force Materiel Command in 1992.

During the integrated weapons system management process, AGM-130 and GBU-15 were determined to be a family of weapons because of the commonality of the two systems. The Precision Strike Program Office at Eglin AFB became the single manager for the GBU-15, with the Air Logistics Center at Hill Air Force Base, Utah providing sustainment support.
