= Martel (missile) =

Martel (AS.37)
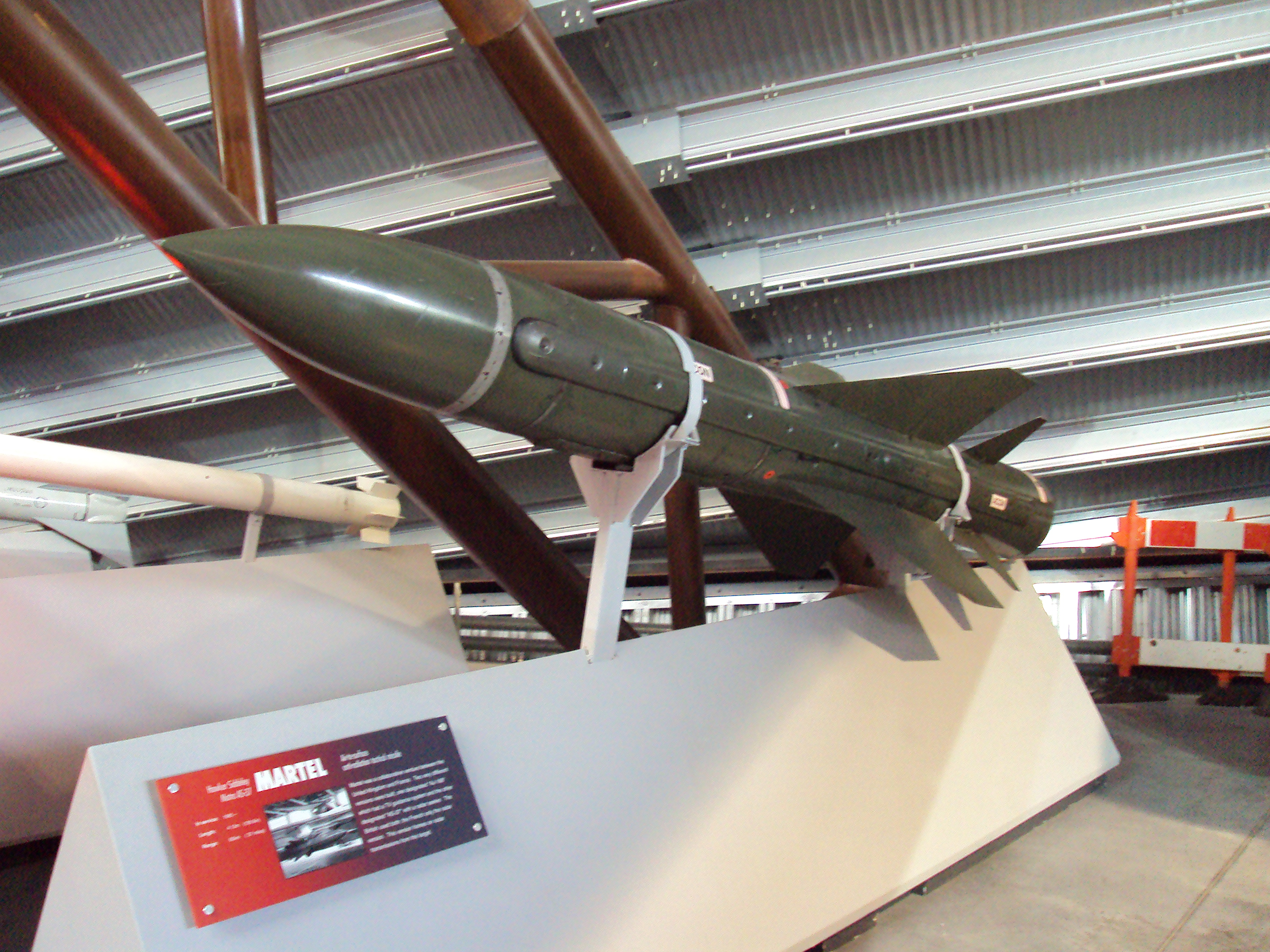
- Martel AS.37 on display at Royal Air Force Museum Midlands Cosford.
- Type: Standoff anti-radar missile (AS 37) / air-to-surface (AJ.168)
- Place of origin: United Kingdom/France

Service history
- Used by: Royal Air Force; Armée de l’Air
- Wars: Operation Epervier; Iran–Iraq War

Production history
- Manufacturer: Hawker Siddeley, Matra
- Produced: 1972
- No. built: 300 antiradar (150 for both France and UK), plus an unknown number of TV version (only for UK)
- Variants: AS.37 "Martel" radar, AS37 "Armat", AJ 168 "Martel" Video

Specifications
- Mass: 550 kg (1,210 lb)
- Length: 4.18 m (13 ft 9 in)
- Diameter: 0.4 m (16 in)
- Wingspan: 1.2 m (3 ft 11 in)
- Warhead: 150 kg (330 lb) and fitted with a Misznay–Schardin plate
- Detonation mechanism: proximity fuze
- Engine: two stage solid propellant rocket motors
- Operational range: 60 km (37 mi) max (estimated, and depending on the launch conditions)
- Maximum speed: Mach 0.9 +
- Guidance system: passive radar homing, video guided
- Launch platform: fixed wing aircraft

The Martel is an Anglo-French missile. The name Martel is a contraction of Missile, Anti-Radiation, Television, referring to the guidance options. There are two variants, the passive radar anti-radiation missile version, AS.37, and the television guided anti-ship missile, AJ 168.

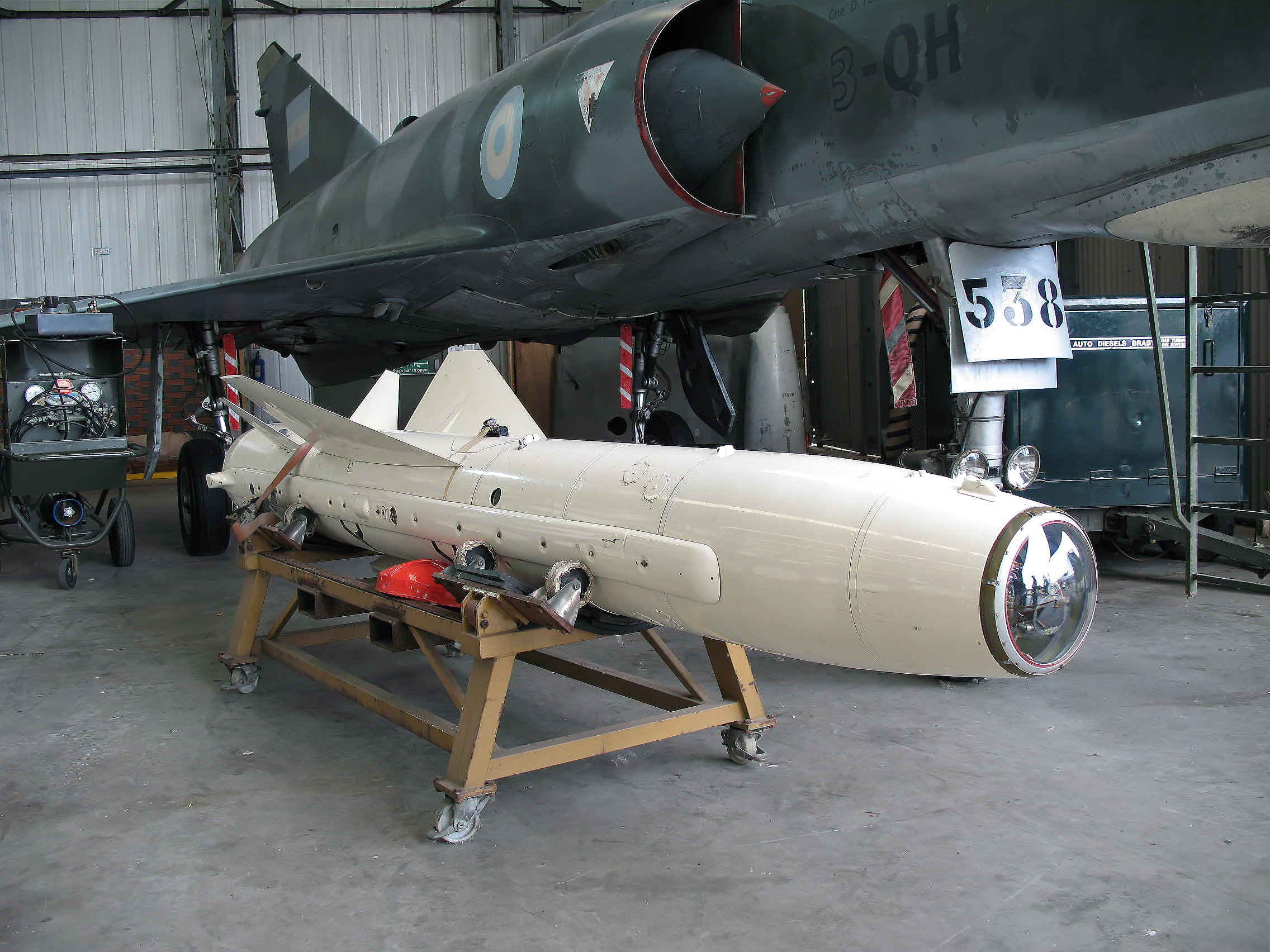
Martel AJ 168 TV-guided missile display round Although displayed alongside a Mirage, the Mirage only carried the AS.37

The aircraft that used these missiles were the Blackburn Buccaneer (up to three TV or four ARM variant), the SEPECAT Jaguar (two), the Mirage III/F1 (one or two), and the Hawker Siddeley Nimrod (at least one). The Martel was suited to anti-ship attack with its long range and heavy warhead. There was not, at the time, a small radar homing missile like the AGM-84 Harpoon with an active radar, so the only viable solution was a video or ARM sensor. With a relatively long range, a heavy payload, and a subsonic speed, this missile compares more to an anti-ship weapon like the Exocet or the AS.34 Kormoran than an anti-radar missile. It weighs three times as much as the AGM-45 Shrike, with half the speed but much greater range and explosive power.

It was possible to adapt the Martel ARM to be used against different wavelength radars. It was an improvement compared to the early AGM-78 Standard ARM missiles, that had only one narrow-band homing sensor. But the ARM sensor was only selectable on the ground, not in flight and so before taking-off it was necessary to know what kind of radar was being attacked.

The UK has used both types, the French only the anti-radiation variant. The Martel fuselage forms the basis for the Sea Eagle anti-ship missile with a turbojet to improve range, while the French used it to develop ARMAT, an advanced ARM missile in the 1980s. For ARM functions, the RAF adopted a totally new and much smaller missile, the ALARM.

== Operational history ==
The Martel was used by France against Libya during the Epervier military operation, supporting Chad. On 7 January 1987 four French Jaguars took off carrying one Martel each. Three did not launch their missiles, for they were programmed to aim at specific radar wavelengths, but the last one hit an SA-6 radar, destroying it completely.

On 7 March, following an air raid by Libyan MiG-21s and MiG-23s, another strike was mounted by ten Martel-equipped Jaguars from EC 4/11 (or more likely EC 3/3 "Ardennes" as that unit was the Martel specialist) against the radar installations at Ouadi Doum air base.

== Operators ==
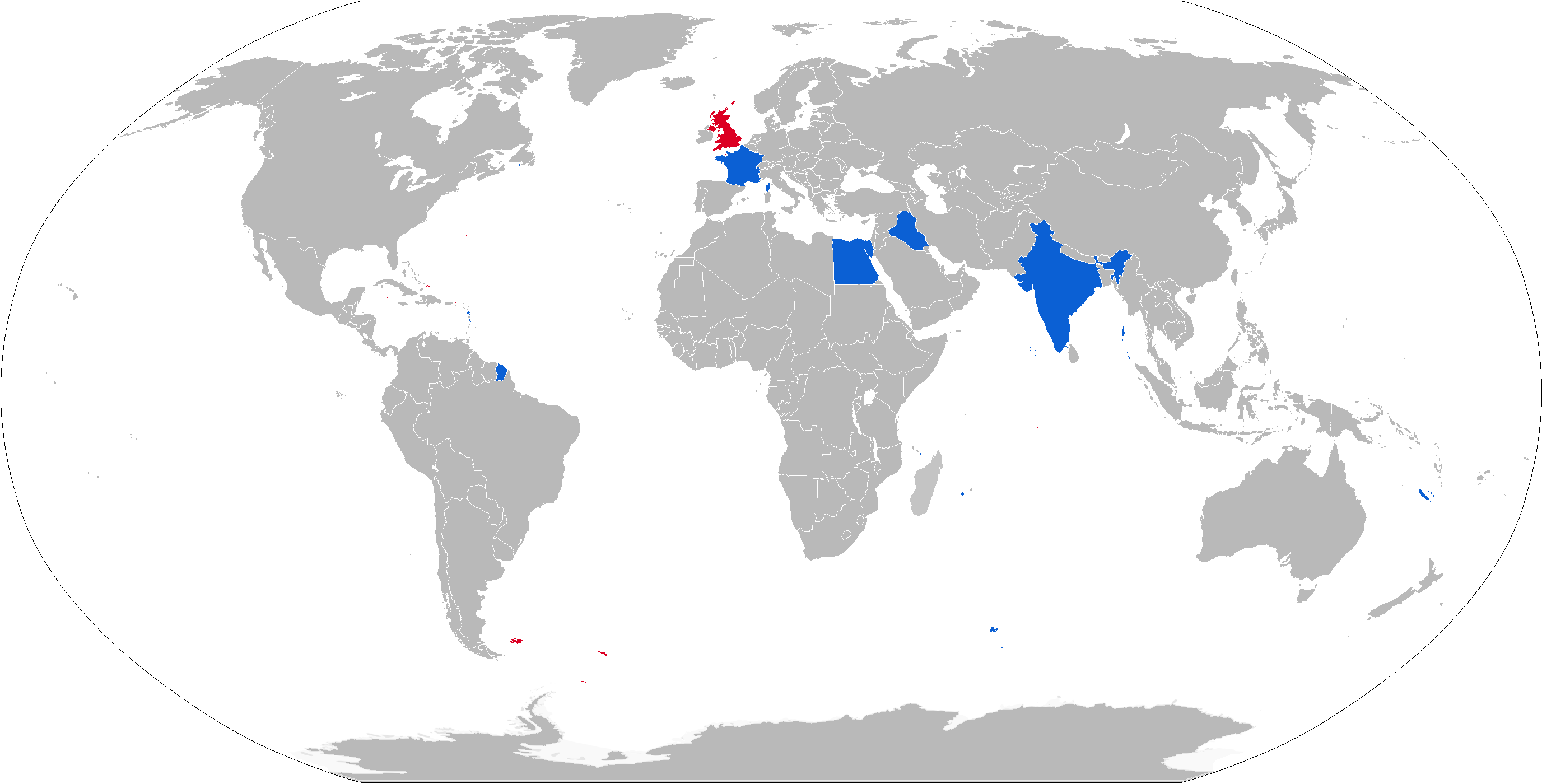
Map with Martel operators in blue and former operators in red

=== Current operators ===
Egypt

- Egyptian Air Force

India

- Indian Air Force

=== Former operators ===
Iraq

- Iraqi Air Force

United Kingdom

- Royal Air Force

France

- French Air Force
