= Air Staff (United Kingdom) =

Air Staff is the body of Royal Air Force officers responsible for the running of the RAF. Generally, the heads of the various departments of the Air Staff formed, together with members of the Air Ministry (the British government department in charge of aviation matters), the Air Council.

The Air Staff issued "Targets" (AST) which were a stated requirement for an aircraft to fulfil a role within the RAF. E.g. Air Staff Target 362 was for a trainer aircraft to replace the Folland Gnat, the resulting aircraft was the SEPECAT Jaguar. When a specification moved from the initial requirements to a production contract, it became an Air Staff Requirement (ASR).

== Composition ==
The Air Staff was composed of several posts.

- Chief of the Air Staff
- Deputy Chief of the Air Staff (1918-1968/9)
- Assistant Chief of the Air Staff – replaced Vice Chief and two Assistant Chief posts
- Vice Chief of the Air Staff (1940–1985)
- Assistant Chief of the Air Staff (Policy) (? -1985)
- Assistant Chief of the Air Staff (Operations) -(? -1985)
- Air Member for Development and Production (Air Council title)
- Air Member for Training (Air Council title)
- Air Member for Technical Services (Air Council title)
- Air Member for Supply and Organisation (Air Council title, 1923–present)

== Notes and references ==
- Barrass, M. B. (2016). "Air Council Posts and Members". Air of Authority – A History of RAF Organisation.
- Barrass, M. B. (2016). "RAF Organizational Structure". Air of Authority – A History of RAF Organisation.
- Barrass, M. B. (2016). "Development of the Air Staff". Air of Authority – A History of RAF Organisation.
