= Aircraft interception radar =

British radar systems in aircraft

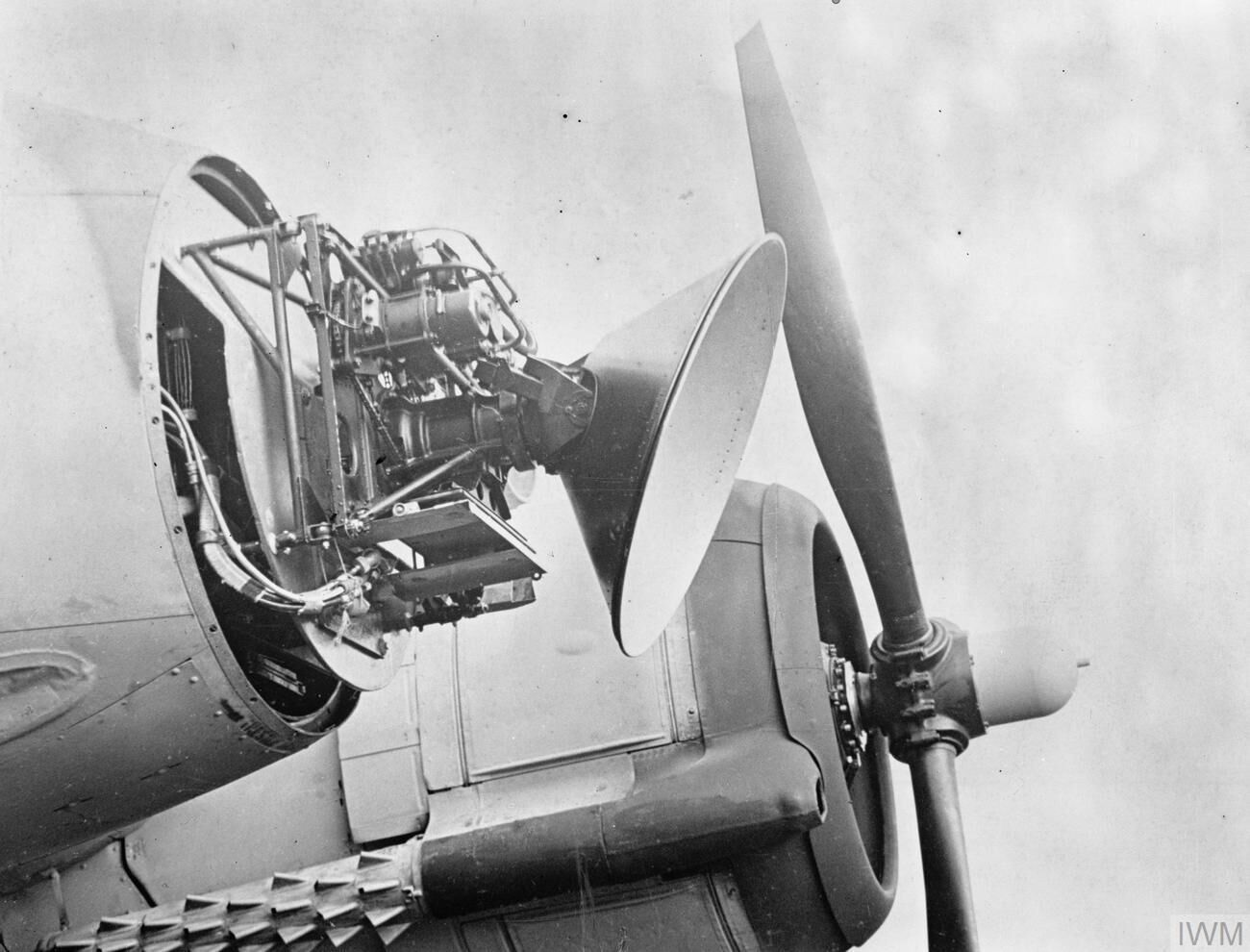
The centimetric AI. Mk. VIII shown here on a Bristol Beaufighter set the pattern for AI radars well into the 1970s.

Aircraft interception radar, or AI radar for short, is a historical British term for radar systems used to equip aircraft with the means to find and track other flying aircraft. These radars are used primarily by Royal Air Force (RAF) and Fleet Air Arm night fighters and interceptors for locating and tracking other aircraft, although most AI radars could also be used in a number of secondary roles as well. The term was sometimes used generically for similar radars used in countries, notably the USA. AI radar stands in contrast with ASV radar, whose goal is to detect ships and other sea-surface vessels, rather than aircraft; both AI and ASV are often designed for airborne use.

The term was first used circa 1936, when a group at the Bawdsey Manor research center began considering how to fit a radar system into an aircraft. This work led to the AI Mk. IV radar, the first production air-to-air radar system. Mk. IV entered service in July 1940 and reached widespread availability on the Bristol Beaufighter by early 1941. The Mk. IV helped end the Blitz, the Luftwaffe's night bombing campaign of late 1940 and early 1941.

Starting with the AI Mk. VII, AI moved to microwave frequencies using the cavity magnetron, greatly improving performance while reducing size and weight. This gave the UK an enormous lead over their counterparts in the Luftwaffe, an advantage that was to exist for the remainder of World War II. By the end of the war, over a dozen AI models had been experimented with, and at least five units widely used in service. This included several US-built models, especially for the Fleet Air Arm.

The AI naming convention was used in the post-war era as well, but these generally dropped the "Mk." when written in short form and used numbers instead of Roman numerals. A good example is the AI.24 radar of the Tornado ADV. These radars were often given common names as well, and generally better known by these; the AI.24 is almost universally referred to as "Foxhunter". Other widely used post-war examples include the AI.18 used on the de Havilland Sea Vixen, and the AI.23 Airpass on the English Electric Lightning. This article will use Mk. or AI. depending on which is most commonly used in available references.

== Development history ==
=== Early radar development ===
In order to provide the maximum possible warning time of an incoming raid, the RAF's Chain Home (CH) radar stations had been positioned as far forward as possible, right on the coastline. These systems could only see targets in front of them, over the English Channel. Tracking over land fell to the Royal Observer Corps (ROC) using visual means. In testing it was found that the two different reporting systems provided information that varied enough to make tracking targets confusing and error prone, and the sheer volume of information could be overwhelming.

Hugh Dowding addressed this through the creation of what is today known as the Dowding system, networking together the radars and observation centres by telephone to a central station. Here, in the Fighter Command's "filter room" at RAF Bentley Priory, operators would plot the map coordinates sent to them on a single large map, which allowed them to correlate multiple reports of the same target into a single track. Telephone operators, or "tellers", would then forward this information to group headquarters who would re-create the map, and then from group to the sector HQs who would give instructions to the fighter pilots.

Due to delays in the flow of information between the various centres, and inherent inaccuracies in the reports coming from multiple sources, this system was accurate to perhaps 5 miles (8.0 km). Within 5 miles the fighters would normally be able to spot their targets visually and complete the interception on their own. Interception rates over 80% was common, and on several occasions the system succeeded in getting every fighter launched into position for an attack.

=== AI concept ===
While the Dowding system proved invaluable inputs during daylight attacks, it was essentially useless against night raids. Once the enemy aircraft passed the coastline they could not be seen by the radars, and the ROC could not see at night except under ideal conditions with bright moonlight, no cloud cover, and considerable luck. Even when tracks could be developed, the difficulty of spotting a target from the cockpit of an aircraft while flying it at night proved to be equally difficult. Henry Tizard wrote a memo on the topic in 1936, indicating that the Germans would likely begin a night campaign if the daylight campaign went as poorly as he believed it would due to Chain Home.

The obvious solution would be to mount a small radar on the aircraft, one able to cover the range between the Dowding system's 5-mile accuracy and the average visual spotting range, about 500 to 1,000 feet (150–300 m). As early as August 1936 "Taffy" Bowen, one of Robert Watson-Watt's hand-picked radar development team, personally requested that he be allowed to start research into an airborne radar set for this role. This was approved, and the small aircraft interception team set up shop in Bawdsey Manor's two towers.

At the time, radar development was in its infancy and the other teams were working with long-wavelength transmitters operating around 7 meters. An efficient antenna requires it to be about 1/2 the wavelength or more, which demanded antennas at least 3 metres (9.8 ft) long, impractical for an aircraft. Additionally, available transmitters were large, heavy and fragile. The first AI experiments thus used ground-based transmitters and a receiver fit to a Handley Page Heyford bomber, with an antenna consisting of a wire strung between the fixed landing gear. A working transmitter was first fit to the Heyford and flew in March 1937. In spite of this success, the system's antennas were still too large to be practical, and work continued on versions working at shorter wavelengths.

== Wartime systems ==
=== AI Mk. IV ===
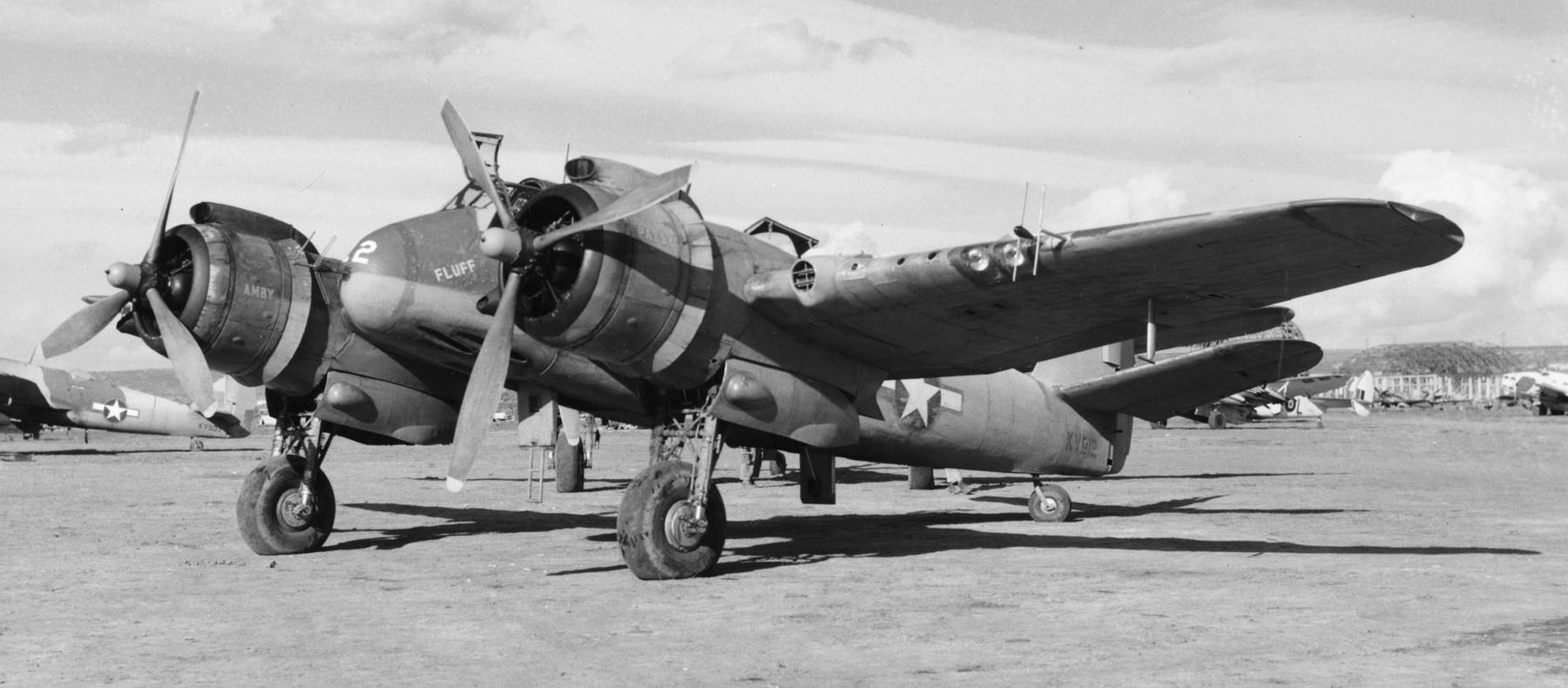
This Bristol Beaufighter Mk.VIF mounts the AI Mk. IV. The transmitter antenna is (just) visible on the nose, the left-side receiver just outboard of the landing lights.

A crude system using a hand-held antenna working at 1.25 m (220 MHz) was ready by August 1937 and fitted to Avro Anson K6260 at RAF Martlesham Heath. This unit demonstrated the ability to detect aircraft at the range of about 1 mile (1.6 km) in the air-to-air mode, but also demonstrated the ability to detect ships on the ocean at ranges up to 3 miles (4.8 km). This ability led to the split between AI and air-to-surface-vessel (ASV) radar systems, both of which would be widely used during the war. Practical ASV radars were operational in 1940, but the AI developments proved much more difficult.

Because ASV proved simpler, the team spent most of their time on that development through 1938. It was not until 1939, with the war obviously looming, that the team was once again moved back to AI development full-time. A lingering problem was that the minimum range remained around 1,000 feet, too long to allow easy interception. This was due to the transmitter signal not turning off sharply, leaking through to the receiver causing it to oscillate or ring for a period. While this powerful signal was dying down, reflections from nearby aircraft were lost in the noise. Numerous solutions had been attempted, but proved to be of limited use.

Starting in late 1939 the development team was asked to fit the existing Mk. III's, a barely functional design, to aircraft. This ended further attempts to address the minimum range issue while they worked on installations. While their development effort ended, the headquarters staff at the University of Dundee attempted to develop their own solutions to the problem. This led to considerable strife and in-fighting between the two groups. The AI group was eventually broken up at the end of March 1940, leaving Bowen out of the AI effort.

A solution was eventually provided by EMI who had developed a new type of transmitter that was not based on the common self exciting principle. Instead, a separate squegging oscillator was used to produce pulses of the carrier signal using a timer. This timer also muted down the receiver, making it less sensitive to the transmission signal and solving the ringing issue. Minimum range was reduced to about 400 feet. The resulting AI Mk. IV went into production in July 1940 and all units were sent to newly arriving Bristol Beaufighters. The Beaufighter/AI Mk. IV achieved its first victory on the night of 15/16 November 1940, when an aircraft from No. 604 destroyed a Junkers Ju 88A-5 near Chichester.

Several advanced versions of the Mk. IV were also produced, which offered direct readings for the pilot and options to allow use in single seat aircraft. However, these developments were overtaken by the rapid improvements in microwave systems, and both the Mark V and Mark VI saw only limited production and service.

=== Mk. VIII ===
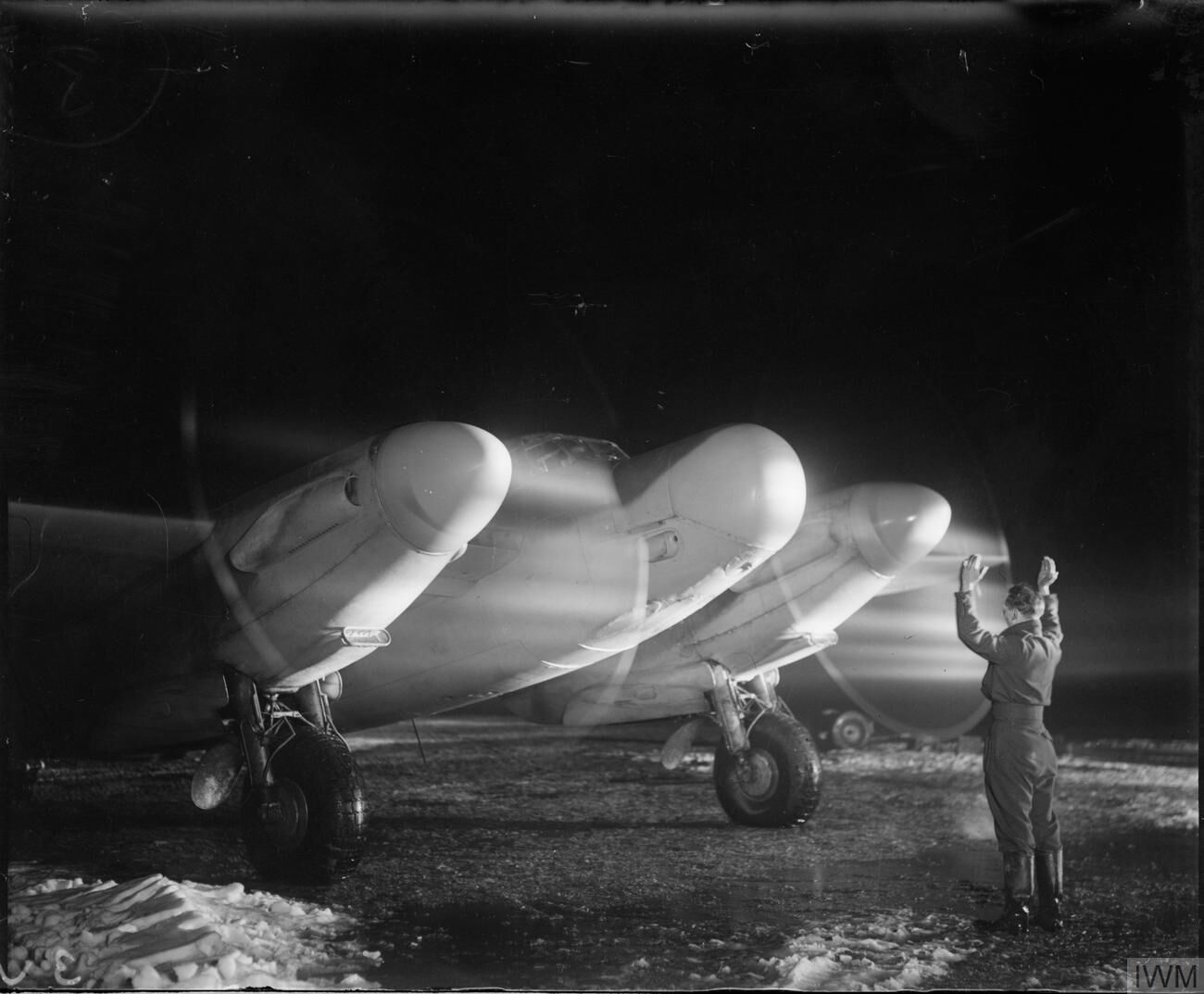
This De Havilland Mosquito NF Mark XIII of No. 604 Squadron shows the distinctive upturned "Bull nose" containing the Mk. VIII radar

In February 1940, John Randall and Harry Boot at Birmingham University successfully ran the first cavity magnetron, eventually generating 1 kW at 9.8 cm (3,060 MHz). Supported by GEC, the device quickly developed into a practical 10 kW system, and several test units were available by May 1940. Microwave wavelengths are so much shorter than the Mk. IV's 1.5 m, fifteen times, that the dipole antennas required for reasonable gain were only a few inches long. This dramatically reduced the size of the system, allowing it to fit entirely in the nose of the aircraft.

While a team under Herbert Skinner developed the electronics, Bernard Lovell was put in charge of examining the use of a parabolic dish to improve the directionality of the signal. The resulting beam was so sharply focussed, spanning about 10 degrees, that it easily avoided ground reflections at even low altitudes. The narrow beam also meant that the radar could only see targets directly in front of the antenna, unlike the Mk. IV which could see anything in the entire volume in front of the aircraft. To solve this problem, the dish was mounted on a bearing system from Nash & Thompson that allowed it to be rotated in a spiral pattern.

The cockpit display was modified to spin the timebase at the same speed as the antenna, 17 times a second. The display still produced blips similar to those on the Mk. IV, but as the timebase now spun, they drew short arcs on the display during the period the antenna was pointed in that direction. Like the Mk. IV, the distance from the center of the CRT indicated the range. As the target moved closer to the centreline of the aircraft, the beam spent more time painting the target, and the arc spread out, becoming a ring when dead ahead.

First introduced in March 1941, it was found that the ground reflection created a sort of artificial horizon on the bottom of the display, a surprising side-effect which proved very useful. However, the limited power of the magnetron, about 5 kW, provided range of about 3 miles (4.8 km), not a great improvement over the Mk. IV. Performance of the system at low altitude was so improved over the Mk. IV that it was decided to make an initial run of 100 units out of what were essentially prototype systems as the Mk. VII, requiring very large amount of aircraft space for the install. Conversions on the Beaufighter began in December 1941.

This run was followed by the production Mark VIII that included the new "strapped magnetron" of 25 kW, improving range to about 5.5 miles (8.9 km). This version also had several major clean-ups in the electronics, support for IFF Mark III which caused a sunrise pattern to appear when aimed at friendly aircraft, and beacon tracking allowing it to home in on ground-based transmitters emplaced by friendly units. In September 1942 a Mosquito NF.II was upgraded to the Mk. VIII, serving as the pattern for the Mosquito NF.XII. Starting in December, Beaufighter units were upgraded to the similar Mk. VIIIA, an interim type awaiting production quantities of the VIII. (Note: A Mk. VIIIB is also mentioned in various sources as a further development of the basic Mk. VIII, but any differences are unclear.)

=== Mk. IX ===
Although the precise origins of the concept are unknown, on 8 March 1941 Lovell mentions the concept of "lock-follow" for the first time in his notes. This was a modification to the spiral-scan system that allowed it to track targets automatically without further manual operation. This became known as AIF. "Freddie" Williams joined the effort, (Note: Hodgkin appears to suggest that it was Williams that led the primary development effort.) and by the autumn of 1941 the system was basically functional and plans began to introduce it as the Mark IX.

Several unrelated events conspired to greatly delay further progress. On 1 January 1942 Lovell was sent to work on the H2S radar project and was replaced by Arthur Ernest Downing. This delayed the project just long enough that it got caught up in a great debate that broke out in the summer of 1942 about the use of window, today known as chaff. Window caused false returns on radar displays that made it difficult to tell where the bombers were amid a sea of blips. Bomber Command had been pressing to use window over Germany to reduce their losses, which were beginning to mount as the German defensive network improved. Fighter Command was concerned that if Bomber Command used it over Germany, the Germans would return the favour and use it over the UK.

A series of tests carried out in September 1942 by Wing Commander Derek Jackson suggested that some changes to the display systems might solve the problems with window on the Mk. VIII. At this point it was suggested that the Mk. IX might ignore the window completely, as the light metal strips rapidly dispersed from the target being tracked, faster than the radar could follow. Further testing by Jackson demonstrated the opposite was true, and that the Mk. IX almost always locked-on to the window instead. Arthur Downing quickly implemented several changes to fix this problem. He was personally operating the system when he was shot down in a friendly fire incident, killing him and destroying the only prototype.

This so greatly delayed the program that the Air Ministry asked Jackson to test the US SCR-720 unit as a stop-gap measure. This proved to be able to pick the bomber from the window, and work on the Mk. IX was given low priority while the UK version of the SCR-720, known as the Mk. X, was purchased. With the night fighter force certain of its ability to continue operating successfully if needed, Bomber Command received clearance to begin using window on 16 July 1943.

Work on the Mk. IX continued, but it never saw operational service. In testing in 1944 it was found to be marginally better than the US SCR-720, but with the SCR-720 expected to arrive at any moment, the demand for another radar was not pressing. Instead, the Mk. IX was given more time to mature. Further development led to more testing in 1948, but it was again passed up for production and cancelled the next year.

=== Mk. X ===
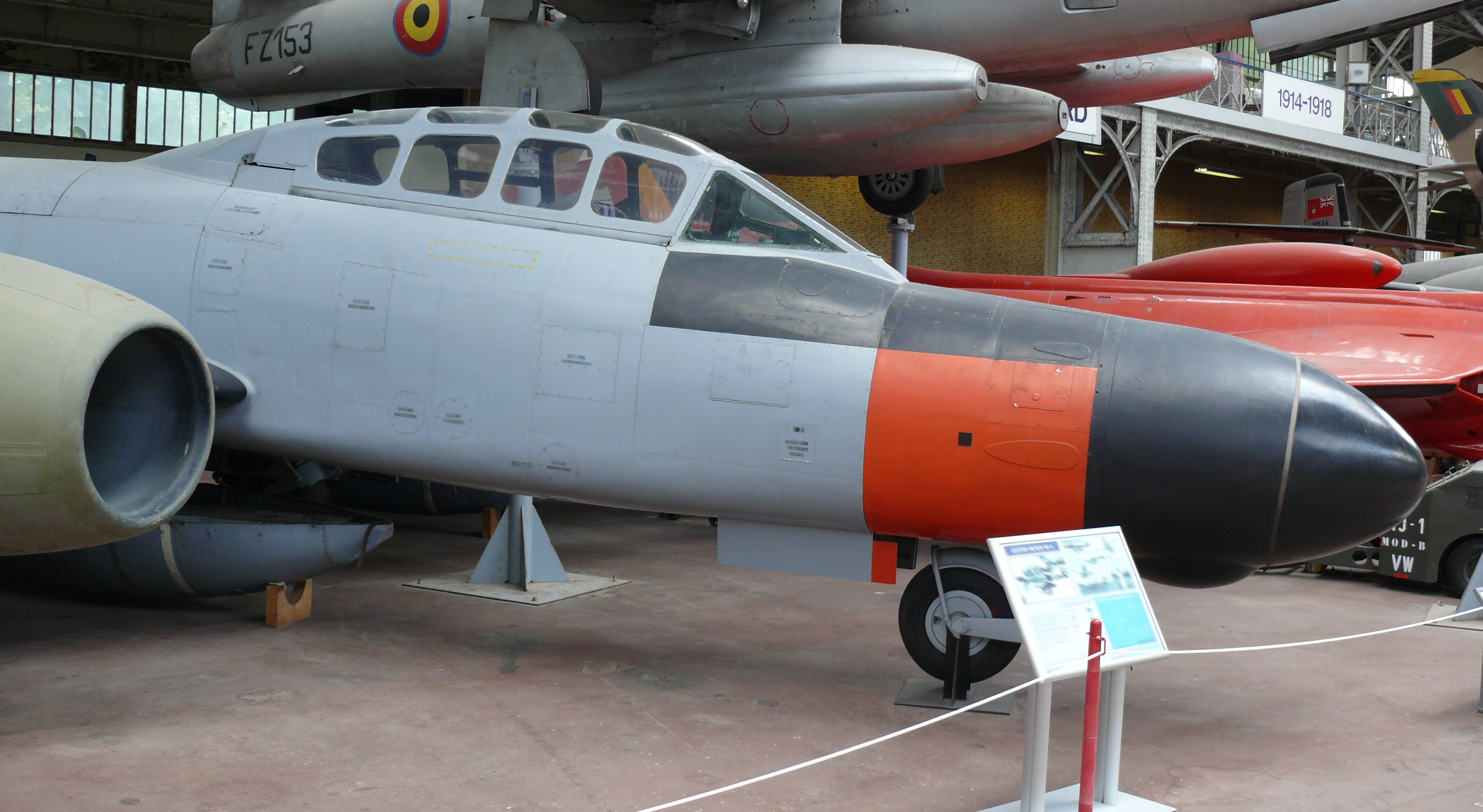
The Mk. X equipped Gloster Meteor NF.11

The Mark X was the UK version of the SCR-720. This was originally promised for delivery in the summer of 1942, but ran into delays and only started arriving in December 1943. These were fit to the Mosquito to produce the NF.XVII and later versions. Conversions at operational units began in January 1944, and the Mk. X remained in service through the rest of the war.

Compared to the Mk. VIII, the SCR-720 used a helical scan instead of spiral. The radar antenna was spun around a vertical axis through an entire 360 degrees 10 times a second, with the transmitter switching off when the antenna was pointed back towards the aircraft. This provided a 150 degree scan in front of the aircraft. As it spun, the antenna slowly nodded up and down to provide altitude coverage between +50 and -20 degrees. The resulting scanning pattern naturally produced a C-scope display on the CRT.

In the post-war period the Mk. X became one of the UK's most widely used fighter radars, largely because a lack of foreign exchange to purchase newer designs, and the poor economy in general which required the RAF to have a "make do" attitude. The Mk. X would go on to equip the first jet-powered night fighters, including the Vampire NF.10 and Meteor NF.11. Small numbers remained in service as late as 1957.

=== Mk. XI, XII, XIII ===
For the Fleet Air Arm, the TRE developed a series of AI radars operating at the even shorter 3 cm wavelength, the X band, which further reduced the size of the antennas. The original model was the Mark XI, followed by the improved Mark XII and lightened Mark XIII. It is not clear if any of these models saw service, and few references mention them even in passing.

=== Mk. XIV, XV ===
These designations were given to the US AN/APS-4 and AN/APS-6 radars, small under-wing X band radars used primarily by naval aircraft.

The APS-4 was originally developed as the ASH, a forward-aimed surface-search system. It was packaged into an underwing pod so it could be used on single-engine aircraft like the TBM Avenger. It proved to have a useful interception function, and was modified to be able to scan up and down as well as just side to side. The Fleet Air Arm mounted it on the Fairey Firefly, which had the size to carry a radar operator and the performance to operate as a fighter. Some were also used on the Mosquito. Considerably later, a single Meteor, EE348, was fit with an APS-4 in a nose mounting as a test vehicle.

The APS-6 was a modification of the APS-4 specifically for the interception role. It replaced the side-to-side scan with a spiral-scan system largely identical to the one in the Mk. VIII. It also included a switch that reduced the scanning pattern to a 15 degree cone in front of the aircraft, producing a C-scope view used during the final approach. This was paired with a new and much smaller display, allowing it to be fit to smaller single-seat aircraft. It was widely used on the F6F Hellcat and F4U Corsair.

== Post-war systems ==
With Mk. IX cancelled in 1949, the Ministry of Supply (MoS) allowed the Mk. X to soldier on while a definitive jet-powered night fighter evolved. This effort underwent similar delays and setbacks before finally emerging as the Gloster Javelin. Two radar sets competed for the design, the Mk. 16 and Mk. 17. The later went into production, and is better known as the AI.17.

=== Mk. 16 ===
General Electric Company's Mark 16 was one of two similar designs competing to equip the Gloster Javelin. The contest was eventually won by AI.17.

=== AI.17 ===
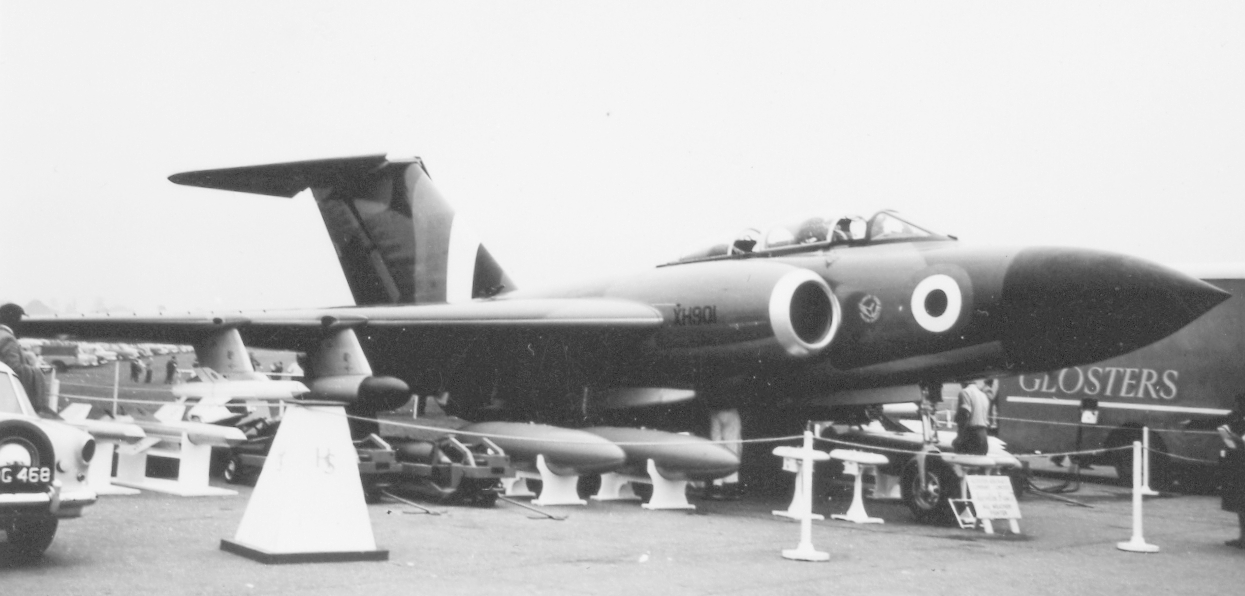
The Gloster Javelin FAW.7's large radome housed the AI.17 radar.

AI.17 (Note: Some sources claim the AI.17 was given the code-name "Yellow Lemon" under MoS's newly introduced rainbow codes system. However, most sources state Yellow Lemon was a Doppler navigation radar intended for the TSR.2 and other aircraft. A contemporary mention in Flight supports the navigation version, stating it is a long-wave doppler radar built by Decca.) was essentially a version of the Mk. IXC with a number of detail cleanups and a 200 kW magnetron for greatly increased range. It could detect a Javelin-sized target at about 20 nautical miles (37 km; 23 mi). It also added the ability to send the alt/az angles of a selected target to the "Blue Jay" missile, which was then under development.

AI.17 entered service with the Javelin in early 1956. Early sets had considerable reliability problems and it was decided to produce another version of the Javelin with the US AN/APQ-43, which on paper appeared to be a better system. In RAF service the APQ-43 became the AI.22, and produced the Javelin FAW.2. In practice, the two systems offered similar performance and the AI.17 quality issues were soon addressed. Future versions of the Javelin mostly mounted the AI.17, although the AI.22 was also used on the FAW.6. The last AI.17-equipped Javelin FAW.9's ended their service in Singapore in 1968.

=== Mk. 18 ===
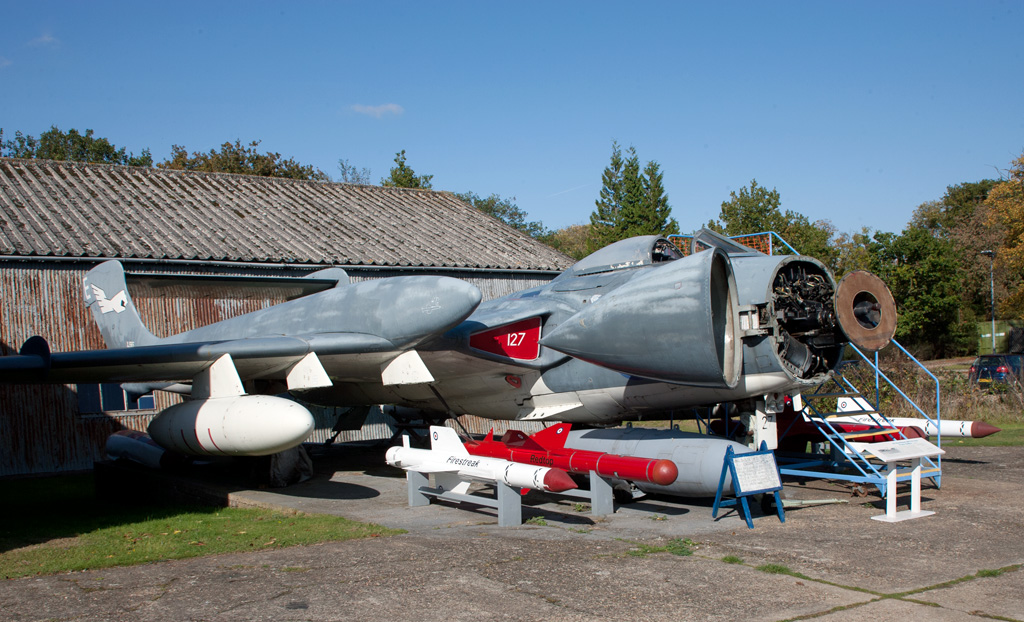
De Havilland Sea Vixen XJ565 displays the unique stiffening ring used in the Mk. 18's parabolic reflector.

Having lost the contest for the Javelin, GEC submitted an updated version of the Mk. 16 for the contest for the de Havilland Sea Vixen. This produced the Mk. 18. Mk. 18 operated in the X band with a 180 kW peak power, using a 29 inches (740 mm) parabolic dish that could be pointed ±100° in azimuth, +50/-40° in elevation, and could keep a lock at as much as 75° in roll. The dish was unique in that it included a fibreglass ring around the outer rim as a stiffener.

Mk. 18 was able to detect the English Electric Canberra at 28 nautical miles (52 km) at altitudes over 20,000 feet (6,100 m) and a closing speed of 900 knots (1,700 km/h). It could detect the Boeing B-47 at 38 nautical miles (70 km) under the same conditions, and could lock-follow after closing to about 25 nautical miles (46 km). When set to its longest range, 100 miles (160 km), it also offered sea surface search, and a ground-mapping display. The AI.18R added modes to support the Red Top missile.

=== Mk. 20 ===
The AI Mark 20 was an X-band radar developed by EKCO Electronics for single seat fighters. Code named "Green Willow" by the MoS, it was intended to be a backup system to the AI.23 being developed for the English Electric Lightning (see below). It is believed that the 1953 contract was awarded to EKCO due to their already existing work on the Fairey Fireflash missile illumination radar.

AI.20 was significantly simpler than the AI.23, being much closer in design to an upgraded AI.17 than the much more advanced AI.23. It used a simple spiral scan system driven at 10,000 RPM, scanning out to 45 degrees and then back every 2.25 seconds. Testing started in 1955, and the AI.20 demonstrated its ability to lock-on to a Hawker Hunter sized target at 7 miles (11 km) 95% of the time, excellent performance for that era. Nevertheless, as AI.23 began successful trials the same year, further work on AI.20 was cancelled.

The next year the MoS published a requirement for a new tail warning radar for the V bomber force, replacing the original Orange Putter, and quickly chose the AI.20 as its basis. This was developed into the ARI-5919 Red Steer, which differed from the AI.20 primarily in the details of the operation and visual presentation. This was later upgraded to the Mark 2 model that equipped the V-force for most of its lifetime.

=== Mk. 21 ===
As the Javelin ran into delays, it was decided to increase the useful life of the existing Meteor and Vampire night fighters with a new radar. After considering three US designs, they chose the Westinghouse AN/APS-57. Its 200 kW transmitter improved range to as much as 25 miles (40 km) although this was rarely achieved in practice. It also included various beacon homing modes, as well as an air-to-surface mode for detecting ships. This was modified to add a British strobe unit and variable pulse repetition frequency, becoming the Mark 21.

The Mk. 21 was first used on the Meteor NF.12 and flew for the first time on the 21 April 1953, entering service in January 1954. Small improvements produced the NF.14, which started deliveries in June. Likewise the de Havilland Venom received the Mk. 21 to become the Venom NF.3, also entering service in June, but was withdrawn by the end of 1957. The Sea Venom flew the Mk. 21 until 1959, and in second-line duty until 1970.

=== Mk. 22 ===
The Mark 22 was the British version of the US AN/APQ-43, (Note: A number of sources confuse the APQ-43 with the APG-43, an unrelated system.) This consisted of two radar antennas driven from a common magnetron transmitter. One used spiral-scan to search for targets, while the second used conical scanning for tracking at close range. This was one of the earliest radars to offer track while scan (TWS) operation, although it did so through the use of what was essentially two radars.

The APQ-43 was one of three designs also considered for updated versions of the Meteor and Venom, the others being the AN/APQ-35 which also had two-dish TWS, and the AN/APS-57. The -35 and -43 proved too large to install in these aircraft, forcing the selection of the -57 as the Mk. 21. The two TWS units proved interesting, and the -43 was considered for the Javelin. These were used in small numbers in the FAW.2 and FAW.6 models.

=== AI.23 ===
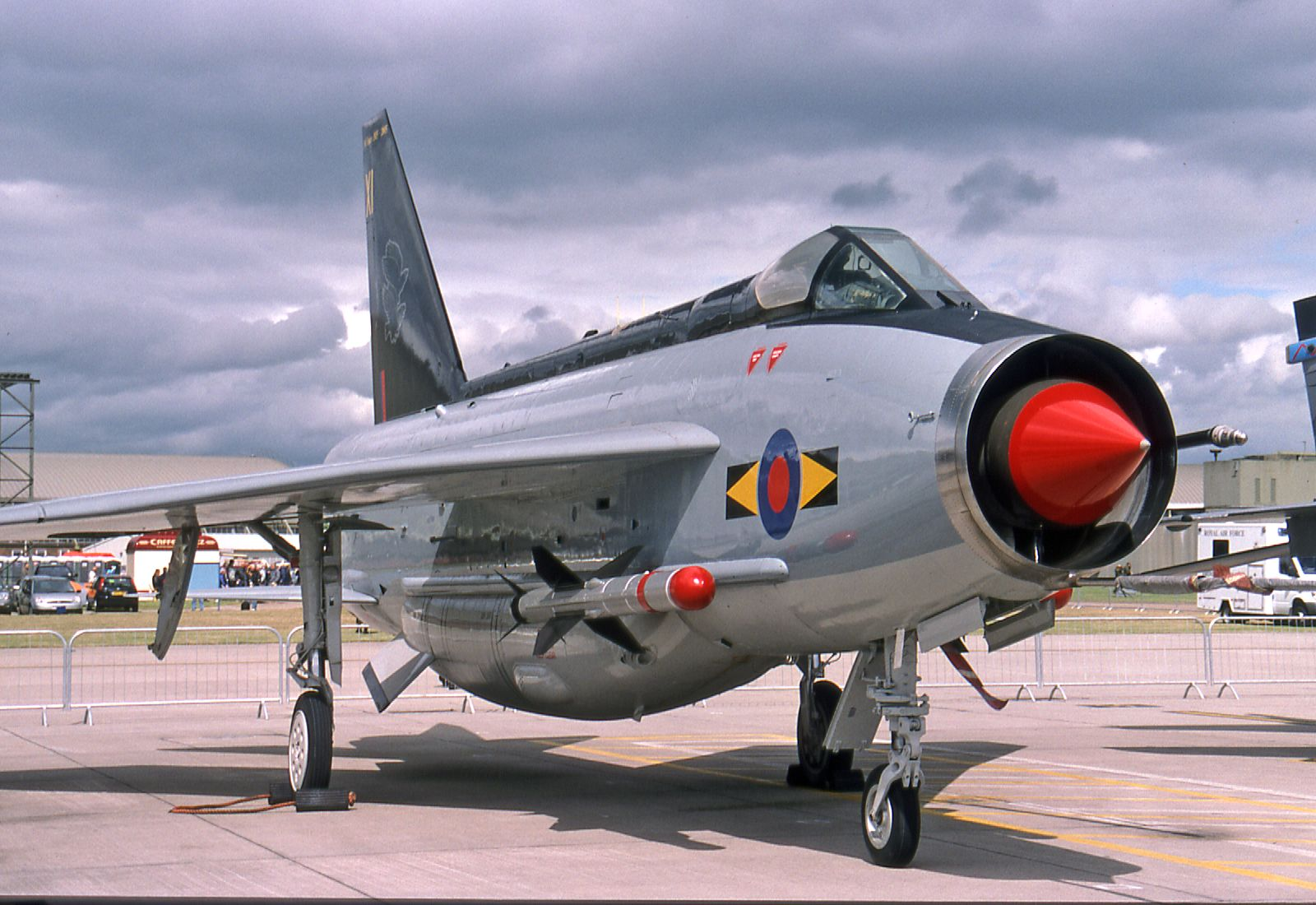
The large red object in this image is the front part of the intake centrebody which houses the AI.23 radar.

Ferranti's Mark 23 was an X band design originally designed for the modified Fairey Delta 2 proposed for the Ministry of Supply's Operational Requirement F.155 for a modern interceptor aircraft. Work on F.155 ended with the infamous 1957 Defence White Paper, but by this time the interim English Electric Lightning design, the P.1, had progressed to the point where development was undertaken anyway (along with TSR.2). This led to continued development of the AI.23 for this aircraft (and Mk. 20, see above), and it was given the official designation "ARI 5897". The system was mounted entirely in a single bullet-shaped housing that was suspended within the Lightning's circular nose air intake.

The AI.23 was the world's first operational aircraft interception monopulse radar system. The monopulse method allows higher resolution and is far more resistant to common forms of jamming. AI.23 also included all of the features of earlier AI radars, and more. Among the highlights were an automatic lock-follow system which fed ranging information to the gunsight, as well as computer-calculated cueing information that located both the target and the proper position to fly to engage based on the selected weapon. For instance, when using missiles, the system guided the aircraft not toward its target, but a point behind it where the missile could be fired. This gave the system its name, AIRPASS, an acronym for aircraft interception radar and pilot's attack sight system.

AI.23 was able to detect and track a Tupolev Tu-95 sized bomber at 40 miles (64 km), allowing the Lightning to accomplish fully independent interceptions with only the minimum of ground assistance. A version with fully automated guidance that would have flown the aircraft into range and fired its missiles automatically was cancelled in 1965.

Further development of Airpass led to AI.23 Airpass II, code named "Blue Parrot" and also known as ARI 5930. This was a version of the Airpass dedicated to low-level flying, especially target detection, fitted to the Blackburn Buccaneer. Further development led to the terrain following radar used in the BAC TSR.2. Many other variants were proposed for a wide variety of projects.

=== AI.24 ===
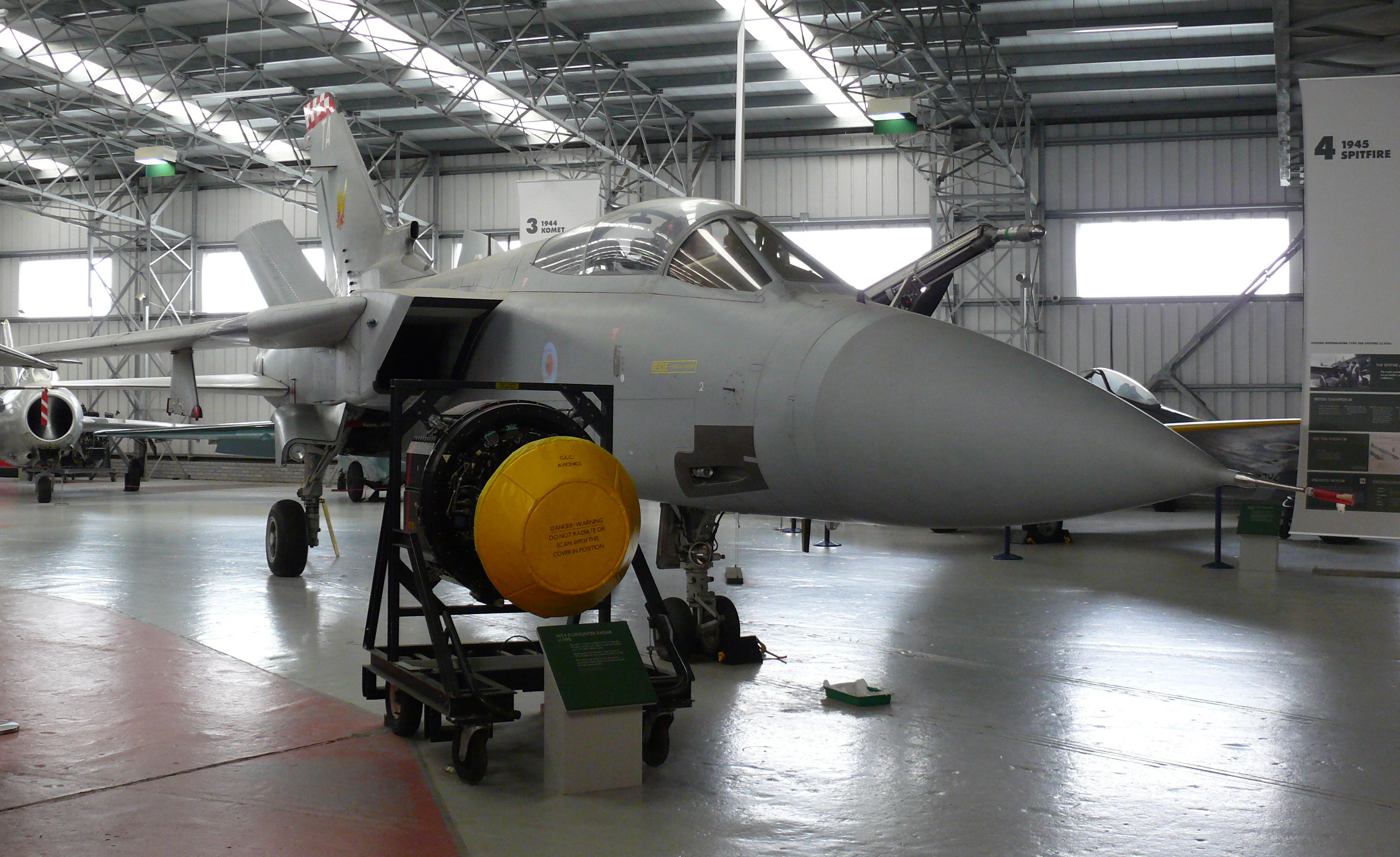
The Foxhunter used a cassegrain reflector which gives the "dish" its unique conical shaping.

The final radar in the UK series of AI designs to see deployment was the Mark 24, better known as "Foxhunter". Foxhunter was developed for the Panavia Tornado ADV, an interceptor development of the Tornado that provides long-range defense against bomber-like targets. Development of the ADV began in 1976 and the radar system contract was eventually won by a curious combined bid; Marconi and Elliot Automation would provide most of the design, while Ferranti built the transmitter section and Antenna Platform.

The first test articles were flight tested in 1981 in the nose of a Hawker Siddeley Buccaneer. Further development slowed, and the radar was still not ready for service by 1987, although the aircraft itself was now rolling off the production lines. In place of the radar a concrete ballast plug had to be installed in early Tornado ADVs, where it was jokingly known as the "Blue Circle radar", a pun referring to the Ministry of Supply's rainbow codes, and a local brand of concrete.

Foxhunter finally entered service in the late 1980s and early 1990s, by which time the older Skyflash missiles were in the process of being replaced by the new AMRAAM. This led to a further series of problems as the radar was adapted to fire this missile. Several mid-life upgrades have also been worked into the Foxhunter program to improve performance. These upgraded versions remain in service with the Royal Saudi Air Force's Tornado F.3's as of 2014.

=== Mk. 25 ===
There are passing mentions of an AI.25, described as a lightened or improved AI.18 for use on an updated Sea Vixen. The numbering is curious, as it suggests that the AI.24 pre-dates it, although this does not appear possible. References to the AI.25 should be considered unreliable without further examples.
