= AI.20 radar =

Type of aircraft radar

AI.20
- Country of origin: UK
- Manufacturer: EKCO
- Introduced: 1955 (testing)
- Frequency: X band
- RPM: 1,000
- Range: 25 mi (40 km)
- Diameter: 18 in (460 mm)
- Azimuth: 45º
- Power: 200 kW
- Other names: Green Willow
- Related: Red Steer

Radar, Aircraft Interception, Mark 20, or AI.20 for short, also known by its rainbow codename Green Willow, was a prototype aircraft interception (AI) radar developed by EKCO for the English Electric Lightning interceptor aircraft. It was ordered as a backup system in case the more advanced AIRPASS radar from Ferranti failed to develop, but when AIRPASS successfully entered testing in 1955, AI.20 was dropped. The system was used, almost unchanged, as the basis for the Red Steer tail warning radar used in the Handley Page Victor and Avro Vulcan strategic bombers.

== History ==
When the English Electric Lightning project first began, existing aircraft interception (AI) radar systems were generally just more powerful versions of their World War II counterparts, using newer magnetron and klystron-based microwave tubes and more sensitive receivers, but otherwise using the same mechanical scanning concepts and simplified processing that generally required a dedicated crewmember to operate. Some British AI radars of the post-war era were hand-me-down units from the US.

For the Lightning, Ferranti proposed an advanced AI radar system that would leapfrog any radar system then in use. An analog computer would read the output from the radar and store it, presenting that information on the pilot's gunsight rather than a traditional display. Additionally, the computer would calculate a proper interception course and display a marker in the gunsight. The pilot simply had to guide the aircraft so the marker remained in the center of the display, greatly easing their workload. This was the first true heads up display, a major advance that allowed a single-crew aircraft to be an effective interceptor for the first time. The result was known as AIRPASS, short for "Aircraft Interception and Pilot's Attack Sight System".

AIRPASS was very advanced, so much so that some in the Radar Research Establishment (RRE) felt that there was the possibility that the system would not mature in time for it to be used on the aircraft, if at all. Accordingly, a second project began for a simpler system, essentially a modernized version of the existing radars. The main change in the requirements was that the display was going to be used by the pilot, not a radar operator, which meant it needed a much brighter display as the pilot could not be expected to put their head down into a hood during the final approach.

The contract for the backup system was awarded to EKCO in late 1953 and assigned the rainbow code "Green Willow". It is believed that they won the contract due to their ongoing work with the "Blue Sky" missile, which emerged as Fireflash. For Blue Sky, EKCO had developed a spiral-scan radar with a range of about 10 miles (16 km) although only against targets very close to the centerline of the radar. A major advantage of this design is that it had been designed as a single unit so it could be fit into the nose of smaller single-seat fighters like the Supermarine Swift, which made it a suitable starting point for the small area available in the Lightning.

For the new radar, power was increased once again, using a 100 kW peak power klystron. The entire system packaged into a pressurized housing, which required the development of an inflatable seal for the fibreglass nose cone.

A significant problem was making a display that could be seen in the cockpit. As the Lightning would be spending most of its time flying above the clouds, it had to be visible even in direct sunlight. To produce bright enough symbols on a cathode ray tube (CRT) required an extremely powerful electron gun. The team selected a 2 1/2 inch model originally powered at 25 kV used for projection television and then adapted that to a 5 inch size display powered at 30 kV. As there was no way to fit a power supply with the required voltage into the instrument panel, power was instead supplied via a long insulated electrical line from the radar's own power supply.

The system was otherwise conventional, using a spiral-scan pattern essentially identical to that of the wartime AI Mark VIII but running at significantly higher speed of 1,000 rpm and "nodding" in and out from dead ahead to 45 degrees off-axis in 18 revolutions and then back again, a complete scan requiring about 2 1/4 seconds. Driving this required a 1/2 horsepower electrical motor running at 10,000 rpm.

The first systems began operational tests in 1955 from RAF Defford, home of the RRE's experimental flight unit. It demonstrated a 95% probability of acquiring a Hawker Hunter sized target at 7 nautical miles (13 km; 8.1 mi). However, by that time the AIRPASS had also begun tests and appeared to have no obvious red-flag issues, so the AI.20 was cancelled.

In 1955, the Royal Aircraft Establishment published a requirement for a new tail warning radar for the V bombers that had greater performance than the existing Orange Putter that had been developed for the English Electric Canberra. The small size and completely compartmentalized design of the AI.20 was a natural fit for this role, and it was selected for this new project under the rainbow code "Red Steer". This decision was apparently led by the RRE's liaison with EKCO, Jerry Steer, for whom the system was named.
