= Red Steer =

Tail warning radar

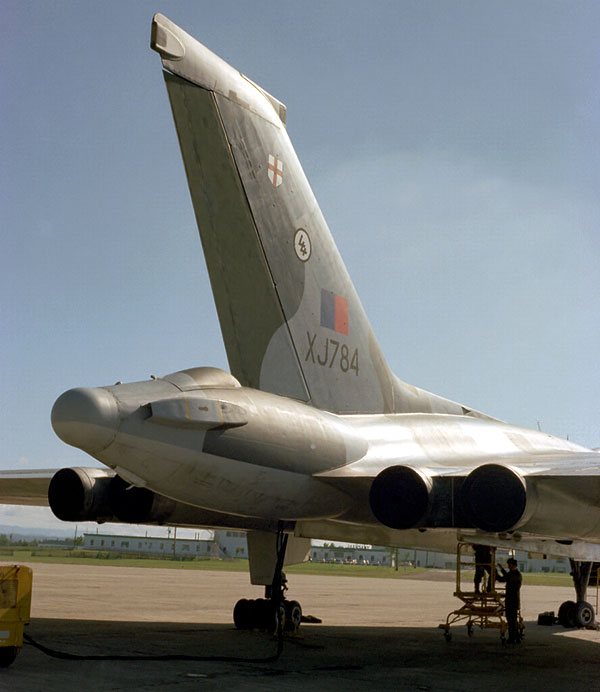
- Red Steer at the tip of an Avro Vulcan's tailcone
- Country of origin: UK
- Manufacturer: EKCO
- Introduced: 1957
- Frequency: X band
- RPM: 1,000
- Range: 18 nmi (33 km; 21 mi)
- Diameter: 18 in (460 mm)
- Azimuth: 45º
- Power: 200 kW
- Other names: ARI 5919, ARI 5952

Red Steer, also known as ARI 5919 and ARI 5952 (Note: ARI is short for "Airborne Radio Installation".) depending on the version, was a tail warning radar used on the British V bomber force. Built by EKCO, it was developed from the experimental AI.20 radar for the English Electric Lightning. The Lightning required its radar to be remotely installed in the nose of the aircraft, and this made the set equally suitable for remote mounting in the tail of the bombers.

Red Steer scanned a cone 45 degrees across behind the aircraft and presented any returns on a display at the electronic warfare station. It was able to reliably detect large fighter-sized aircraft at about 10 nautical miles (19 km; 12 mi). Lacking any defensive weapons, the purpose of Red Steer was to allow the operator to give instructions to the bomber pilot to evade the approach of an interceptor, as well as properly time the use of various electronic countermeasures against the interceptor's radar, notably the Red Shrimp.

Red Steer began replacing the earlier Orange Putter in 1957, after crews suggested the earlier system was too limited. In service, Red Steer was found to be difficult to operate due to its display system. This led to the upgraded Mark 2 version with a greatly improved display and increased range to 25 nautical miles (46 km; 29 mi). These were fitted to the Avro Vulcan and Handley Page Victor fleet in the 1960s and remained in operation with them until they left service in the 1980s and 90s.

== History ==
=== AI.20 ===
During the initial work that led to the English Electric Lightning, Ferranti proposed an entirely new aircraft interception (AI) radar system. It was to be fully computerized, automating the entire task of detecting a target, plotting an efficient interception course, and cueing the weapons fire when the target came into range. Further, the system presented this data not on a dimly lit cathode ray tube (CRT), but projected right on the pilot's gunsight. The system, later known as AIRPASS, was more advanced than any other AI radar at the time.

Some within the Air Ministry felt that it might be too advanced and brought technical risk that might delay the Lightning program. They ordered a second system using conventional electronics as a backup. A contract was sent out in 1952 and won by EKCO based on their work on the illuminator radar for the Blue Jay missile. EKCO had developed a medium-range limited-angle radar for that role, but it could be easily adapted to provide longer range and greater angles. The main new feature of the system was to use the very high voltage power supply that normally fed only the radar's magnetron and using it to power the CRT display as well. This provided enough brightness to be read even in full sunlight.

Assigned the rainbow code "Green Willow", the new radar entered testing in 1955. By this time, the first AIRPASS units were also entering testing and it appeared there were no red-flag issues that might delay its production. Green Willow, also known by this time as AI.20, was cancelled.

=== Red Steer ===
Shortly after the cancellation of AI.20, the first of the V bombers entered squadron service. These aircraft were equipped with a simple tail warning radar known as "Orange Putter", originally built for the English Electric Canberra. In early V-bomber use it was found to be almost useless in its intended role of warning the bomber of an approaching interceptor aircraft with enough time to take evasive action.

This led to a 1956 Request for Quotation for an improved radar in the tail warning role. In order to fit within the tailcone area, a small, containerized system was required. This made the AIRPASS and AI.20, both designed to fit in the nose cone of the Lightning, naturally suited to this role. As the radar only needed to provide direction and range information, the complexity of a system like AIRPASS was not required and there was no need for the more complex calculations its computers provided. This made the simpler AI.20 almost perfectly suited to the role. The only concern was that the 30 kV supply line now had to run not just a few feet from the nose to the cockpit, but from the rear of a very large aircraft to the front, through the fuselage. This required new couplings and tests in a vacuum.

Assigned the rainbow code "Red Steer", the project appears to be named in honour of RRE Project Officer Gerry Steer, as opposed to something totally unrelated, as required by the Rainbow Code rules. A Vickers Valiant was modified to carry the system in testing. In January 1958 it demonstrated its ability to detect a Hawker Hunter with a 75% probability at 10 nautical miles (19 km; 12 mi), rising to 100% at 8 nautical miles (15 km; 9.2 mi).

All further installations were carried out on the Avro Vulcans and Handley Page Victors. These installations were known as ARI 5919. From 1960, these aircraft were modified with larger tail cone sections to carry both Red Steer and a much-enlarged suite of electronic countermeasures.

=== Mk. 2 ===
In operational use, the display system of Red Steer was found to be difficult to interpret correctly. This was due to the spiral scan display, which showed the zenith angle of the target relative to the tail of the aircraft directly, but the angle out from the centreline was shown as the length of the blip and the range as the distance from the centre. As the interceptor approached, the blip would grow in length and begin to move rapidly on the display. The resulting motion of the blip has been described as a "nightmare to interpret" and led to jokes about the Soviets not attempting to jam it as such attempts would not make it any harder to read.

This led to the introduction of the Red Steer Mark 2 in the late 1960s, the original version retroactively becoming Mark 1. The system abandoned the spiral-scan display and instead used an X-Y scan (C-scope) that swept horizontally across 70 degrees in azimuth and then stepped up or down to make another sweep at a different elevation, making a complete cycle from 25 degrees above to below the centreline over a period of eight horizontal scans. The system had an effective range against fighter-sized targets at 25 nautical miles (46 km; 29 mi), which provided ample tracking time before the interceptor could close to missile range. These units were known as ARI 5952 in service.

Mark 2 units remained in service through the lifetime of the V-force, leaving front-line bomber service in 1984. Their only use in combat was on the Vulcans taking part in Operation Black Buck during the 1982 Falklands War. In this case, the unit aboard XM607 failed when the pressurization of the radar unit failed due to the 15-hour flight at high altitude, far longer than anticipated in its design. The last units to see action were those aboard the Victor air tankers during the Gulf War in 1992. These were officially retired in 1994. The operational details of the Red Steer signals remain classified to this day.

== Description ==
=== Mk 1/ARI 5919 ===
The original ARI 5919 version consisted of two units, the radar system in the tail and the display unit at the Air Electronics Officer (AEO) station in the cockpit. The radar used an 18 inches (460 mm) parabolic reflector driven in a spiral at 1000 rpm by a 1/2 horsepower electric motor. The scanning went from dead astern to 45 degrees out over a period of 18 rotations, and then back in again, scanning out a 90 degree cone over a period of about 2 1/4 seconds.

The display unit, developed when available phosphors were dim, required very high voltages to allow it to be visible in a sunlight fighter cockpit. For this purpose, they used a single 30 kV power supply for both the radar and the display, running a highly insulated cable the short distance from the nose of the aircraft to the display in the cockpit. The high output was not required in the V-bomber installations as the EW station is not brightly lit, but the system was not modified. This required the high voltage line to be run most of the length of the aircraft from the tail to the EW station. This presented some concern, and led to extensive testing and the development of new connectors.

The beam-width of the scanner was about 5.5 degrees, which meant that a target at long range would "paint" a short arc on the CRT display as it moved during scanning. The angle of the "blip" around the face of the display indicated the target's angle in relation to dead astern, for instance, a blip at the 10 o'clock location on the display indicated the target was to the left and slightly above the bomber. However, as the target approached the dead astern location, the beam-width meant it would become illuminated for more time, eventually all the time. This resulted in the blip stretching out around the display, eventually turning into a ring. The total angle of the blip thus indicated how close to centred the target was; at 3 degrees off-centre, it produced an arc 180 degrees wide.

To further confuse issues, the display was "inside out" compared to other spiral-scan radars. The blip on the display was produced by sending the output from the radar receiver amplifier to the CRT's brightness control, causing the normally invisible beam to brighten to visibility. In most such radars, the beam was drawn from the centre of the tube outward over the time of the radar pulse and its return, so the blip would appear further from the centre as the range increased. This had the undesirable side-effect that the return tended to disappear at close range because the centre of the display was often showing a continual bright dot due to it constantly being drawn over even at normally invisible intensity. For AI.20, then, this was reversed, with the beam being drawn outside-in, avoiding this problem and rendering only very distant targets in the dead area. Unfortunately, this produced an almost unreadable display at short range as the blip grew to huge size and moved rapidly around the face of the display as the target changed location even slightly.

=== Mk 2/ARI 5952 ===
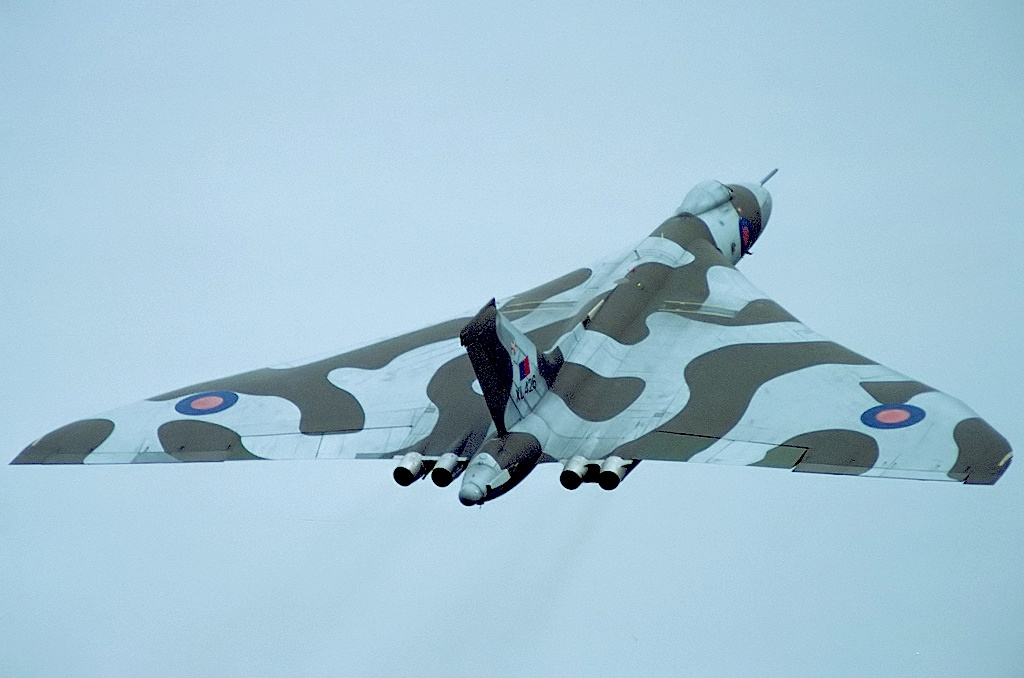
Late model Vulcans featured a greatly enlarged tail area that contained an expanded suite of electronic countermeasures, including the ARI 5952 dome at the extreme end.

For the ARI 5952 version, the scanner and display were replaced, keeping the rest of the radar electronics including the transmitter and receiver systems. The scanner was taken from the EKCO E190 weather radar for airliners. The new M2269 scanner had a 24 inches (610 mm) reflector which reduced the beam-width to 3.7 degrees and thereby increased gain.

The scanner moved side-to-side instead of in a spiral, sweeping 75 degrees to either side of the aircraft centreline, producing a display 150 degrees wide behind the aircraft. With each sweep, the scanner would "nod" up or down in eight steps, finishing 25 degrees above and below the centreline. The result was a rectangular scanning pattern somewhat wider than the original, but with somewhat less vertical coverage. As the V bombers were now approaching their targets at low altitude, the lack of vertical coverage was not a concern. The entire system was stabilized to the line of sight, so the image did not move as the aircraft manoeuvred, another major advantage over the original model.

The matching M2212 display was also rectangular, at 3 by 5 inches (76 by 127 mm). It used a more modern yellow phosphor and no longer required the high voltage feed in order to be visible in direct sunlight.

== Units on display ==
- A Red Steer ARI-5952 is on public display at the City of Norwich Aviation Museum in Horsham St Faith, Norfolk
