= Red Shrimp =

Radar jammer

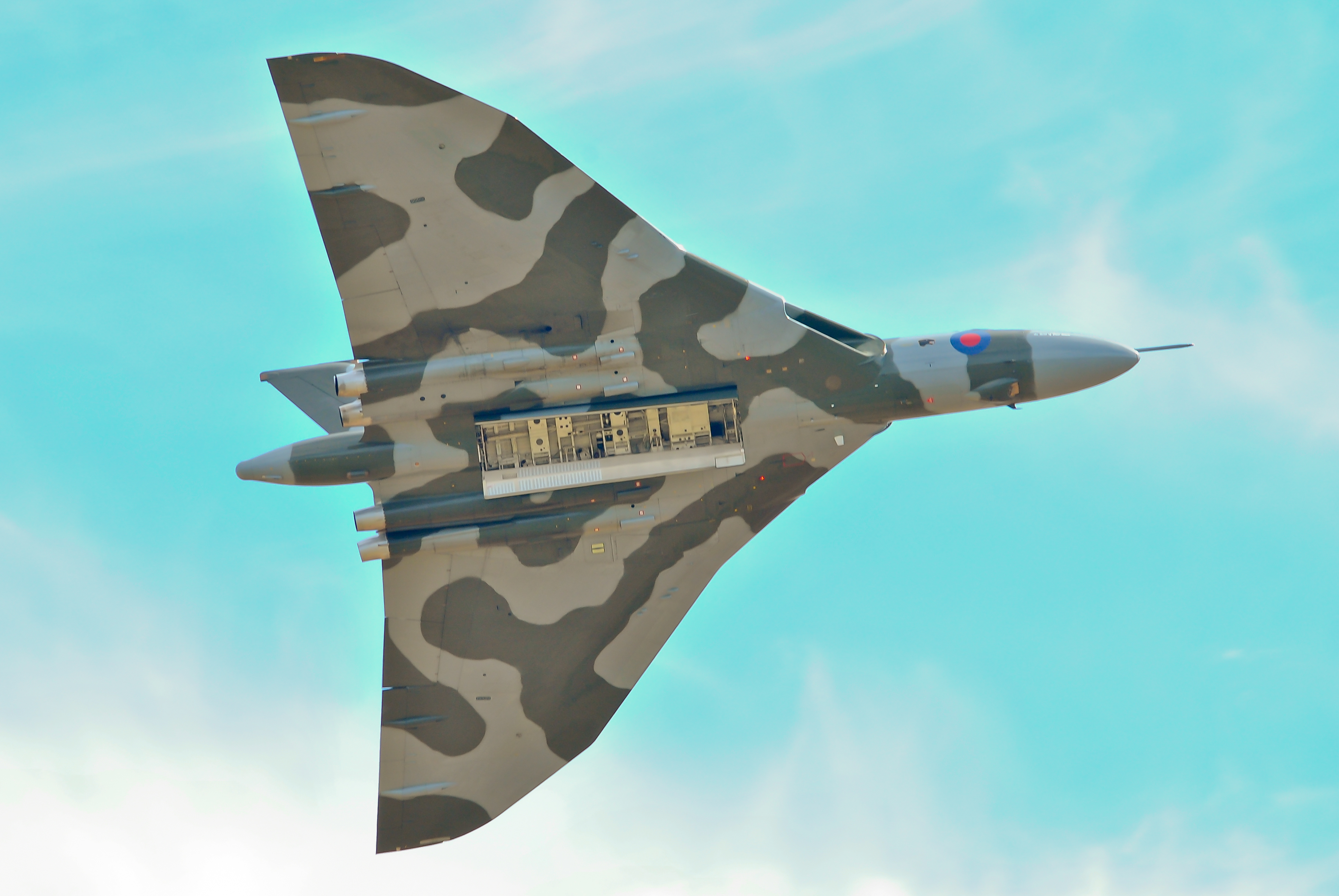
XH558 displaying in 2012. Red Shrimp can just be seen as the two black dots between the tailpipes of 3 & 4 engines, uppermost in this photo.

Red Shrimp was an airborne high-bandwidth radar jammer fitted to the Vulcan and Victor. The name was one of the Rainbow Codes, its official name was ARI.18076, for Airborne Radio Installation.

Red Shrimp was based on the carcinotron, a new type of vacuum tube introduced in 1953 by the French company Thomson-CSF. The carcinotron produced microwaves across a wide bandwidth and could be tuned as quickly as a single input voltage could be changed. They rapidly swept through all of the frequencies used by enemy radars, hitting their operational frequencies hundreds of times a second. These would be plotted on the radar's plan position indicator, filling it with so many "blips" that the bomber was invisible.

Red Shrimp remained operational on the V-bomber fleet through its entire history. Although it was still operational during the Falklands War, it was considered obsolete and not used in combat.

== Operation ==
Red Shrimp (or ARI 18076 (Note: ARI: Airborne Radio Installation)) was a wide-coverage jammer for radar between 2.5–3 GHz. This is in what was described as S band at the time (1 GHz - 3 GHz), but is now termed the D and E frequency bands. It was based on a carcinotron or backward-wave oscillator (BWO) valve. This is a variable frequency voltage-controlled wide-range oscillator. Changing the control voltage, without requiring any mechanical adjustment, could produce a high-power jamming signal which could be adjusted rapidly to jam any radar frequency.

The main target for the jamming was the Fan Song radar, the target acquisition radar of the S-75 Dvina (NATO: SA-2 Guideline) surface-to-air missile. The Blue Diver jammers targeted its UHF-band Knife Rest early warning radar.

The Red Shrimp antenna was quite small and housed in a downward-pointing hemispherical dome, approximately 6 inches in diameter. These were of dielectric material coloured black or dark grey and unpainted. Their signal was broadcast downwards as a cone of around 45° included angle. Later on, as the aircraft switched to operating at extremely low level, this gave a ground coverage patch barely larger than the aircraft's shadow.

== Fitment ==
=== Valiant ===
The first Red Shrimp fitment was to a Valiant of the Bomber Command Development Unit. The BCDU was a development unit which operated Valiant WP214 from the end of 1955 as a trials aircraft.

By mid-1958 the Electronic Counter-Measures (ECM) (Note: Termed RCM at the time, for Radar Counter Measures) fitment which would become standard for the V bombers had been developed. Equipment was mounted in a series of sealed cylindrical drums, each weighing around 200 lbs, the limit of what could be manhandled for servicing. These were installed in the tail of the aircraft and slid into place on an overhead trolley rail. A water-glycol cooling system, the Vapour Cycle Cooling Pack (VCCP), was used to cool the equipment, with a large external cooling air intake. An additional AC power system was added to supply enough electrical power. Rather than being engine-driven, this was an air-powered turbo-alternator.

==== 18 Squadron ====
From 1958 to 1963 18 Squadron operated as a dedicated ECM squadron, having been formed from the Valiant-equipped C flight of 199 Squadron, which had developed the role post-war. These seven (Note: WP213, WZ365, WZ372, WP212, WP215, WP216 & WP211, in order of conversion at RAF Watton) were the only ECM-equipped Valiants. The initial intention for these aircraft was that they would be used for training UK air defences, simulating a Soviet ECM-using threat. Any idea of a war role for them, as an ECM escort for an attack force of Valiant bombers, developed later. This also required 18 Squadron to start training for the same QRA 'scramble' exercises as the Bomber Command main force.

The S band jammer of the 18 Squadron Valiants was the magnetron-based US-made AN/APT-16A jammer. This was a much simpler and less capable system, without the frequency agility of the carcinotron devices. The Carpet 4 (ARI 18030, AN/APT-5) spot jammer, had been trialled in Lincolns and also the 18 Squadron Valiants, but it was unreliable and ineffective, so never used.

The electrical supply of the Valiant was also a limitation. The Valiant and first Vulcans had a 112 V DC electrical system, although the trials aircraft had a more powerful 240 V AC system. The DC system was not powerful enough to supply active ECM, such as Red Shrimp, and so those aircraft were limited to the radar warning receivers and chaff dispensers. This omission was never upgraded, as the Valiant's service life was so short.

From 1958, the new 18 Squadron were based at RAF Finningley, South Yorkshire, as was the BCDU. Nick Prager, a Czech-born sergeant with the BCDU in the ECM servicing section of the base, together with his wife Jana, supplied photographs of the ECM manual set (Note: Blue Diver and Red Steer were the systems most affected.) to the Czech Intelligence Service. He was arrested for this in 1971, after betrayal by the defector Josef Frolík, and sentenced to 12 years for spying. 230 OCU, the training unit for Vulcan crews, was also based at Finningley from 1961.

As it became clear that the new low-level penetration role would involve bombers travelling singly, each bomber would need its own ECM fit. The squadron retained a development and training role for some time, but this could be performed by simpler aircraft, such as Canberras, than the Valiants and so 18 Squadron was disbanded in 1963.

=== Vulcan ===
==== Vulcan B.1 ====
The original Vulcan B.1 had a fairly simple ECM fit, with little more than chaff dispensers and the Orange Putter tail warning receiver from the Canberra and Valiant.

Additional equipment could be carried along the side walls of the bomb bay, in a series of up to nine containers. These included the Green Palm VHF voice communications jammer, Indigo Bracket, an early carcinotron-based jammer, and Red Carpet X-band (Note: X band, 6,200 – 10,900 MHz. This is the old NATO designation for X band, now split into H band and I band, with X band also used for a different but overlapping band. See X band.) radar jammer. Each system was designed to be as self-contained as possible, with the minimum of additional installation around the airframe. The Olympus 104 engines at this time had insufficient electrical generating capacity for such an ECM fit and so an internal ram air turbine was fitted, as for the trial Valiant WP214. This Turbo Alternator TGA 30 Mk 1 was mounted internally and driven by an air inlet near the port engine air intake.

==== Vulcan B.2 ====
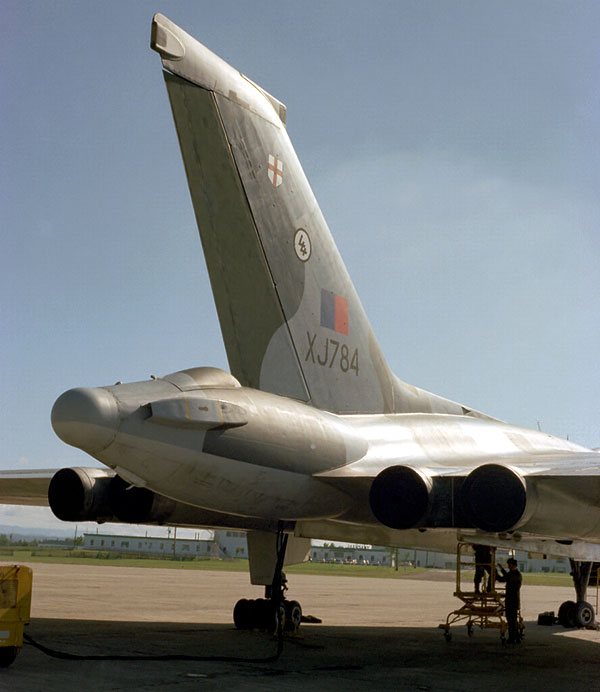
Extended ECM tail

The Vulcan B.2 and B.1A both used an extended rear fuselage, extended into a more bulbous tailcone. (Note: Although the first B.1, XH533 did not receive one, the first full-specification B.2 being XH534.) The end of this was now a hemispherical radome for the Red Steer tail-warning receiver, rather than the pointed cone of the B.1. A large rectangular box-like duct on the starboard side was the cooling air duct for the condenser of the VCCP. The braking parachute was inside a hatch on the top, now visible as an external bulge. The nine sealed and pressurised drums of the ECM equipment were arranged in two rows within this tail, with access through hatches in the bottom.

The Red Shrimp antennae were arranged on panels added between the engines, usually the 3 & 4 engines (starboard). Some aircraft had three on one side, others two and one on each. Blue Diver also used a blade aerial in early years, later wingtip aerials.

Name		Function	
Green Palm	ARI 18074	VHF Comms Jammer	later replaced by ARI 18146
Blue Diver	ARI 18075	B-band UHF Jammer	
Red Shrimp	ARI 18076	S-Band Jammer	(~3 GHz)
Red Steer	ARI 5919	Tail warning radar	
Blue Saga	ARI 18105	Passive RWR	later replaced by ARI 18228

==== Vulcan B.1A ====
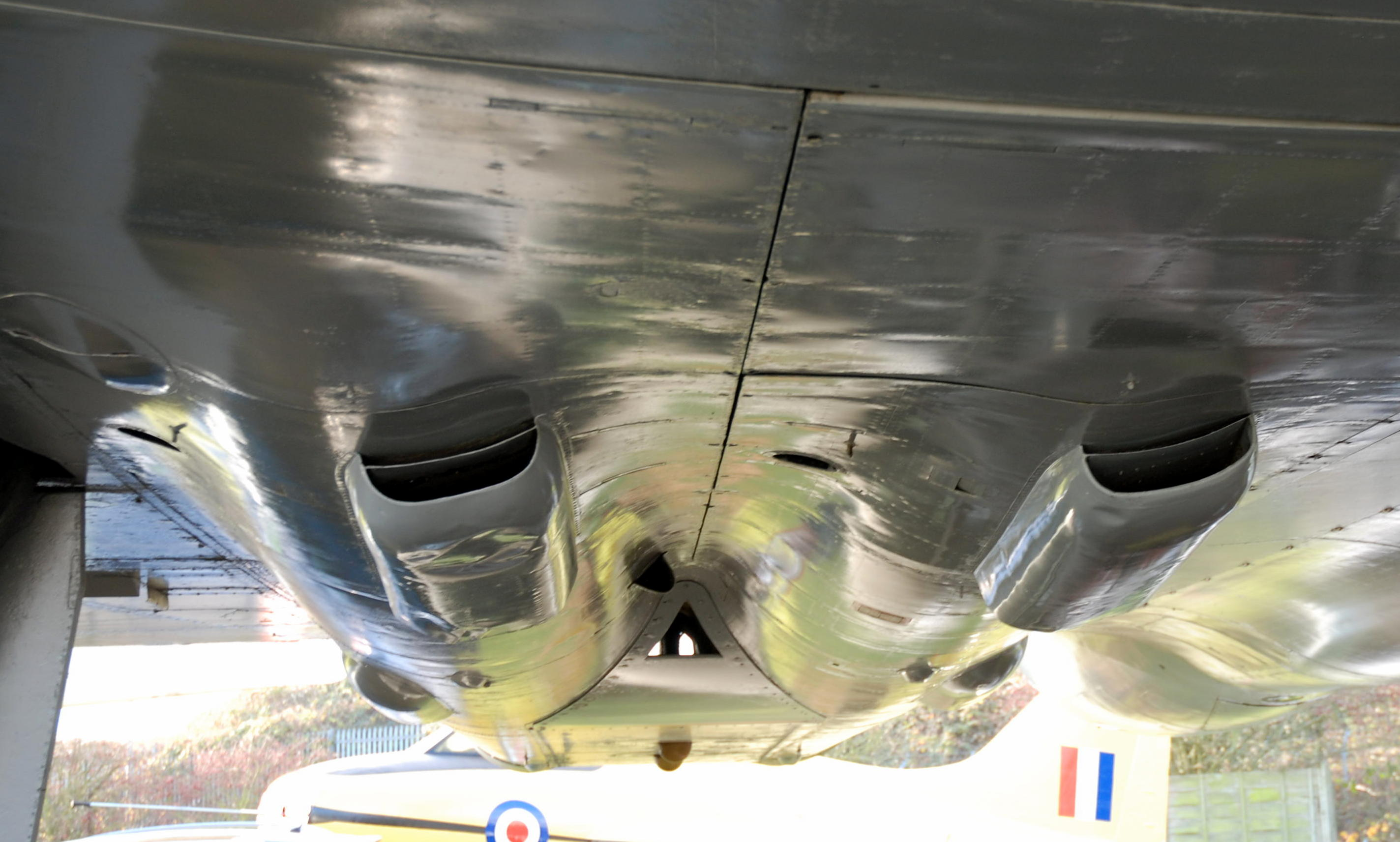
Counterpoise panel between engines, showing two Red Shrimp hemispheres

The Vulcan B.1A was an interim design, converted from B.1 aircraft. ECM was a planned part of the new B.2 aircraft with their extended Phase 2C wing, and although there was great urgency to the delivery of the new B.2 aircraft and the first would arrive before the first B.1A, the simpler conversion would permit thirty ECM-equipped aircraft to enter service more quickly than a similar number of B.2s.

==== Low-level ====
After the Nassau Agreement at the end of 1962, Britain's primary nuclear deterrent was to switch to the Royal Navy and the submarine-launched Polaris missile. (Note: Polaris' takeover of this role took several years to implement and did not take place until 1969.) A combination of this change of emphasis in the nuclear triad, and the increasing effectiveness of Soviet anti-aircraft missiles at high altitude, (Note: As evidenced by the Garry Powers U2 shootdown in 1960.) led to the V-bomber force being re-tasked from a high-level attack to a high-low-high profile with a low-level approach. V-bomber crews had trained to evade the earlier SA-1 Guild and SA-2 Guideline missiles centred around Moscow by jamming and using Green Satin and NBS to weave their headings often enough to prevent a successful firing lock-on.

By 1963 the Soviet SA-3 Goa missile was now in service, with its Low Blow radar. This could also be countered by Red Shrimp. SA-3 though was mobile and deployed in large enough numbers that it could be placed on the border, and around other targets than Moscow. This meant that a successful attack against an SA-3 defence would have to be carried out below its effective height. (Note: A surface-to-air missile has a threat profile resembling a balloon, where it is ineffective or shorter ranged both above and below its optimum interception altitude.) That meant attack profiles below 500 feet, and even lower over hills. (Note: Unlike a radar horizon, the missile's effective height is based on the relative altitude from the launcher.)

The B.1 aircraft were re-tasked from Spring 1963, the B.2s from 1964. Visible evidence for this was Mod.1877, repainting from anti-flash white to a two-colour camouflage scheme.

Despite the change in role, there was no change in the Vulcan ECM fit. There was little development of this for the next twenty years and it became increasingly less effective. Situational awareness of the threat was reasonable, but ability to counter it was reduced. Most obviously, the Red Shrimp jammers were mounted on the underside, facing downwards. At low level, they were masked by the same terrain which the aircraft was using to shield itself and so the area over which they could radiate became inconsequentially small. One important advance which was installed was a terrain-following radar (TFR), with a small thimble radome added to the nose, from 1966.

==== Falklands War ====
During the Falklands War and Operation Black Buck, the Vulcan and its ECM equipment were considered obsolete. Green Palm and Blue Diver at least, although there was still some respect for Red Shrimp. However Red Shrimp was a barrage noise jammer, for which twenty years of countermeasures had developed solutions. The anticipated Argentinian threat of Super Fledermaus, Skyguard AA cannon and Roland were expected to be capable of defeating it, at least at close range. The Vulcans thus borrowed US-made AN/ALQ-101D deflection jammer pods and trained with them over the Spadeadam range. As a result, the Black Buck missions left Red Shrimp unused and relied on the Dash 10.

=== Victor ===
From the twenty four B.1A conversions, the Victor had the same EW fit as the Vulcan, with Red Steer, Blue Saga, Green Palm, Blue Diver, Red Shrimp and chaff dispensers.

=== TSR2 ===
Design studies during the early development of TSR2 recommended the provision of an X-band carcinotron, such as Red Shrimp, in the aircraft, or at least the provision of space for one. However budget constraints led to this provision being removed from the formal requirement. Naval / Air Staff Target 830 for future jamming provision was still under consideration at the time the TSR2 project was cancelled. The likelihood was that TSR2 would use pylon-carried external equipment, if the mission required it.

== Controls ==
Controls for Red Shrimp, the control unit Type 9422, were simple and amounted to little more than switches to turn it on and off, to switch the two automatic operating modes, and to monitor its performance, current draw and temperature. It was controlled by a small panel on the AEO's lower desk, at the right of the rear cockpit (facing the rear).

== See also ==
- List of Rainbow Codes
- RX12874 or 'Winkle', a passive-detection system intended to counteract carcinotron jamming
