= Map of the Earth =

Map of the Earth may refer to:

- World map, map of world areas, population, and other geographical features. The World map is a document that gives a view on the earth. Some World Maps include country borders or colored different continents.
- Political map, map showing regional boundaries

== See also ==
- Nap-of-the-earth
