= AN/ALQ-153 =

US military aircraft tail warning radar

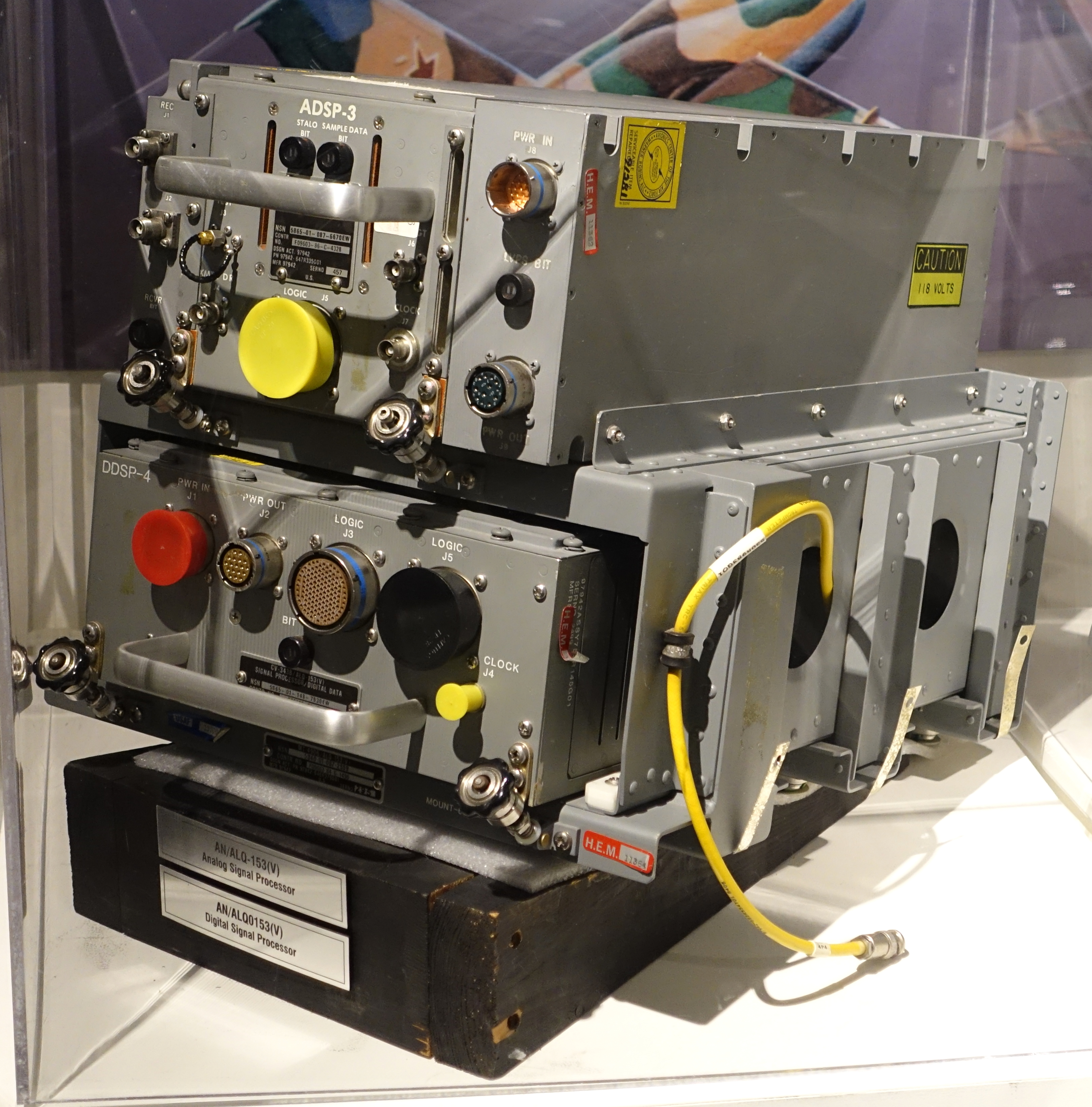
AN/ALQ-153 analog signal processor (top) and digital signal processor (bottom) at the National Electronics Museum

AN/ALQ-153 is an airborne range gate pulse-Doppler tail warning radar for detecting anti-aircraft missiles, protecting Rockwell B-1B Lancer and B-52G/H Stratofortress aircraft. It replaced the RCA AN/ALQ-127, introducing a solid-state transmitter, frequency-agile waveform and digital processor using non-scanning antennas that have low backlobes. The ALQ-153 was originally manufactured by Westinghouse Electric Corp, now supported by Northrop Grumman.

== History ==
Competitive evaluation of the Westinghouse ALQ-153 against the AN/ALQ-154 manufactured by AIL began in 1975. At that time, both manufacturers received initial development contracts of US$2,000,000 (equivalent to about $11,966,605 in 2025) each. By December 1975, Westinghouse was awarded a contract for more than 300 systems over the next five years, and in 1978, they were selected as prime contractor. In 1980, the first operational units were delivered.

Installed on B-52 aircraft at Barksdale Air Force Base, ten flight tests were conducted in May and June 1981. During these tests, totaling 39 hours, there were four failures with a mean time between failure (MTBF) rate of 9.75 hours. By 1986, Westinghouse was awarded an additional US$102,727,898 (equivalent to about $301,728,116 in 2025) to supply spares and war reserve stocks including 192 Radar receiver/transmitters, 159 Analog Data Signal Processors and 197 Digital Data Signal Processors. Deliveries were complete by February 1991.

The US Air Force is the only operator of the AN/ALQ-153. It was never approved for foreign military sales.

== Technical Description ==
In accordance with the Joint Electronics Type Designation System (JETDS), the "AN/ALQ-153" designation represents the 153rd design of an Army-Navy electronic device for special countermeasures system. The JETDS system is also now used to name US Air Force systems.

=== Features ===
Although primarily used for missile defense, the ALQ-153 could accurately warn of aircraft threats as well providing continuous range and time-to-intercept indications on the control indicator. When an approaching missile is detected, an audible tone is transmitted to the electronic warfare officer (EWO) allowing them to respond with the proper countermeasures. The radar also provides automated management of expendable flare and chaff countermeasures used to decoy approaching missiles.

=== Components ===
The ALQ-153 consists of six line replaceable units (LRUs), with a total size of 2.82 cubic feet (0.080 m^{3}) weighing 180 pounds (82 kg). The LRUs include:

LRU	Weight	Volume
Radar receiver/transmitter (RRT)	22.8 lb (10.3 kg)	0.8 cu ft (0.023 m^{3})
Analog Data Signal Processor (ADSP)	47.5 lb (21.5 kg)	0.65 cu ft (0.018 m^{3})
Digital Data Signal Processor (DDSP)	37.0 lb (16.8 kg)	0.55 cu ft (0.016 m^{3})
RF Processor (RFP)	70.0 lb (31.8 kg)	0.72 cu ft (0.020 m^{3})
Antennas (x2)	3.5 lb (1.6 kg)	0.1 cu ft (0.0028 m^{3})

== See also ==
- List of military electronics of the United States
