= Monica (radar) =

Tail warning radar for bombers in World War II

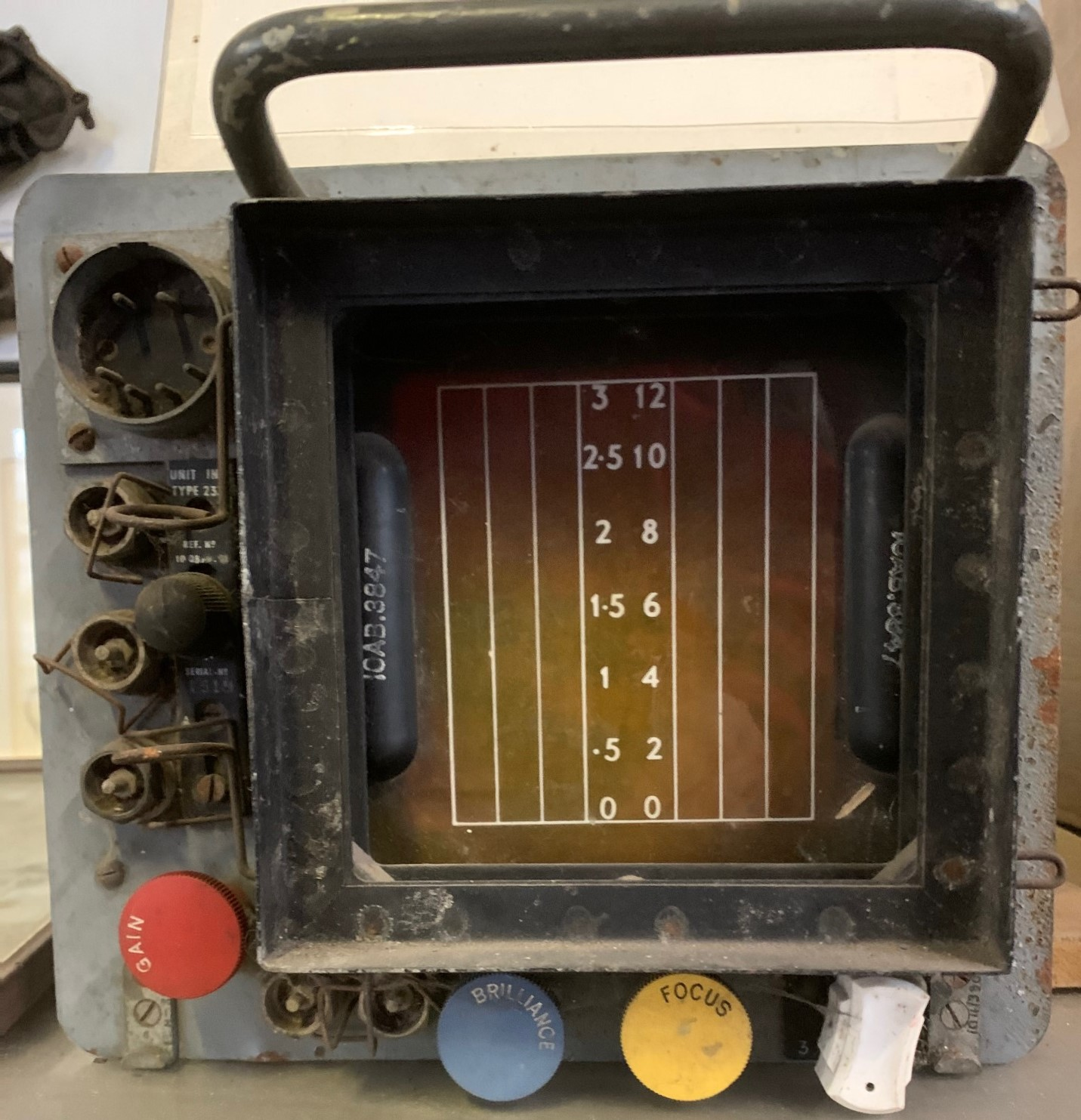
- Monica Mk III Indicator Unit
- Country of origin: the United Kingdom
- Introduced: June 1942

Monica was a range-only tail warning radar for bombers, introduced by the RAF in June 1942. Officially known as ARI 5664, it operated at frequencies of around 300 MHz (on the boundary between VHF and UHF). The system was also used by the US Army Air Forces, under the name AN/APS-13, and the nickname Archie.

== History ==
Monica was developed at the Bomber Support Development Unit (BSDU) in Worcestershire. After the Luftwaffe became aware of Monica from a crashed bomber, German scientists developed a passive radar receiver, named Flensburg (FuG 227). From early 1944, FuG 227 was used by nightfighter crews to home in on Allied bombers using Monica. However, on the morning of 13 July 1944, a 7.Staffel/NJG 2-flown Junkers Ju 88 G-1 nightfighter equipped with Flensburg mistakenly landed at RAF Woodbridge. After examining the Flensburg equipment, the RAF ordered Monica withdrawn from all Bomber Command aircraft. An AN/APS-13 was used as a radar altimeter during the Atomic bombings of Hiroshima and Nagasaki by the 509th Composite Group, USAAF.

== See also ==
- List of radars
- List of World War II electronic warfare equipment
- List of military electronics of the United States
