= Flensburg radar detector =

German passive radar receiver

The FuG 227 Flensburg was a German passive radar receiver developed by Siemens & Halske and introduced into service in early 1944. It used wing and tail-mounted dipole antennae and was sensitive to the mid-VHF band frequencies of 170–220 MHz, subharmonics of the Monica radar's 300 MHz transmissions. It allowed Luftwaffe nightfighters to home in on the Monica tail warning radar fitted to RAF bombers.

An RAF bomber with Monica radar crashed in German-occupied territory in February 1943 allowing for the development of Flensburg. The British set was captured just seven days into its operational life in February 1943. On the morning of 13 July 1944, a Junkers Ju 88G-1 night fighter of 7.Staffel/NJG 2 equipped with Flensburg landed at RAF Woodbridge by mistake and was captured. When British military scientists examined the Flensburg equipment, they quickly realised its purpose and informed the RAF, who ordered Monica to be withdrawn from all RAF Bomber Command aircraft.

Subsequently, further variants of Flensburg (Flensburg II to Flensburg VI) were developed for detecting Allied radar jammers. Only Flensburg II and III were used operationally.
