= Nap-of-the-earth =

Very low-altitude flight technique

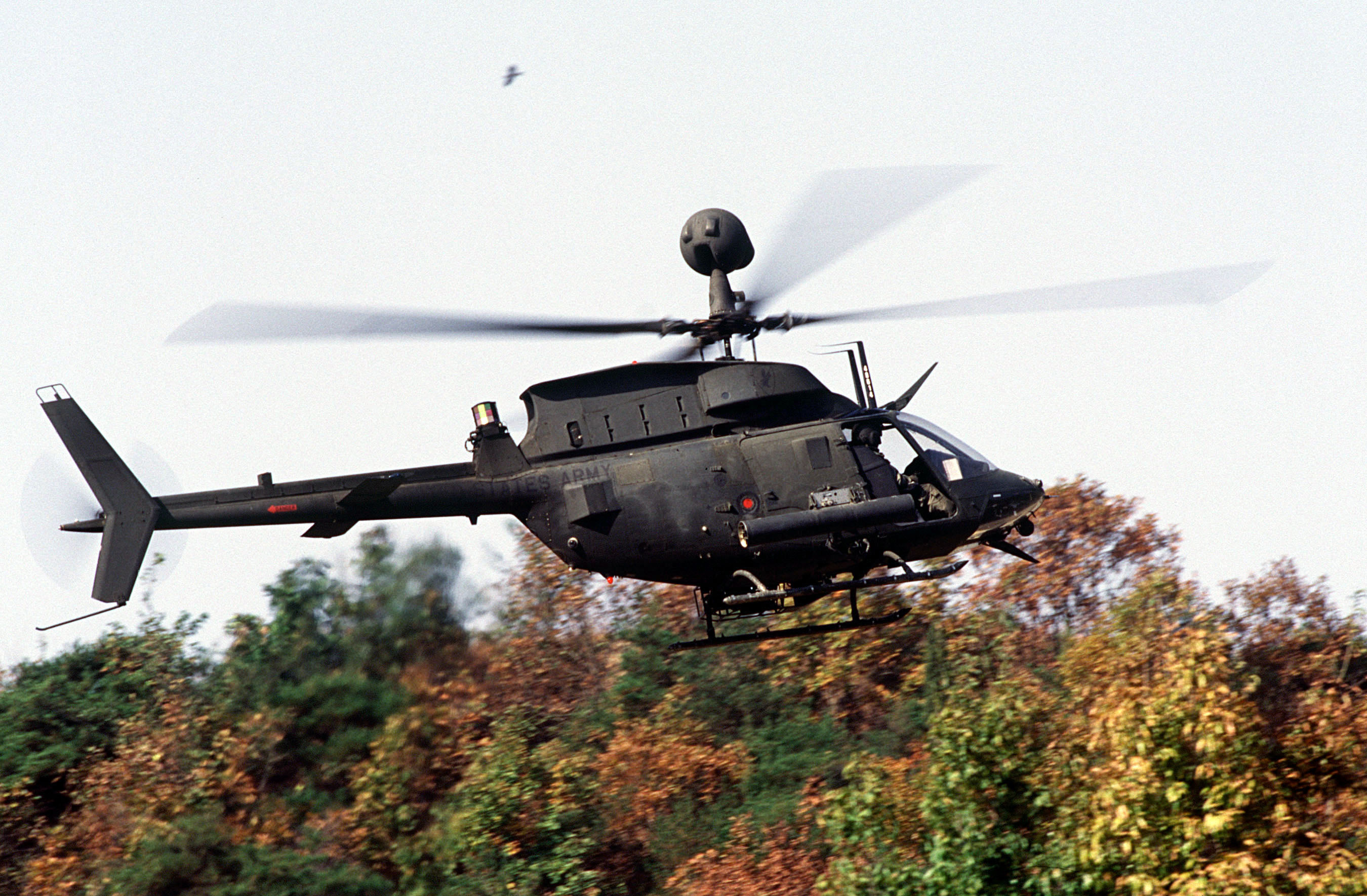
Helicopter using treetops as cover

Nap-of-the-earth (NOE) is a type of very low-altitude flight course used by military aircraft to avoid enemy detection and attack in a high-threat environment. Other, mostly older terms include "contour flying", "ground-hugging", "terrain masking", "flying under the radar" and "hedgehopping".

During NOE flight, geographical features are used as cover, exploiting valleys and folds in the terrain by flying in, rather than over, them. This keeps the aircraft below enemy air defence radar coverage, avoiding being silhouetted against the sky.

== Purpose ==
Terrain masking

NOE is used to minimize detection by hostile aircraft, airborne early warning and control surveillance and control systems, ground-based radar, or attack targets.

A high-flying aircraft can be detected by defense systems at long range, giving an air defense system time to react, alerting surface-to-air missile and anti-aircraft systems and fighter aircraft. Using NOE flight, the approach may be undetected; the aircraft "pops up" to attack the target and then turns to escape before the enemy can respond. Doppler radar has the potential to detect NOE flight, but the incoming aircraft has to be within radar range in the first place, and low flight minimizes this possibility by using hills and mountains to break the line of sight (terrain masking), defeating terrestrial air defense radar and in rough enough terrain also airborne early warning.

== Sensors for NOE ==
Most NOE flying is done during the day using visual reference by pilots who are experienced in low flying. Data from a radar altimeter or terrain-following radar system is also used, the latter enabling low flying in adverse weather where it would not be possible by visual reference and manual pilot control. At night, a night-vision device may be used.

== Helicopter NOE flying ==
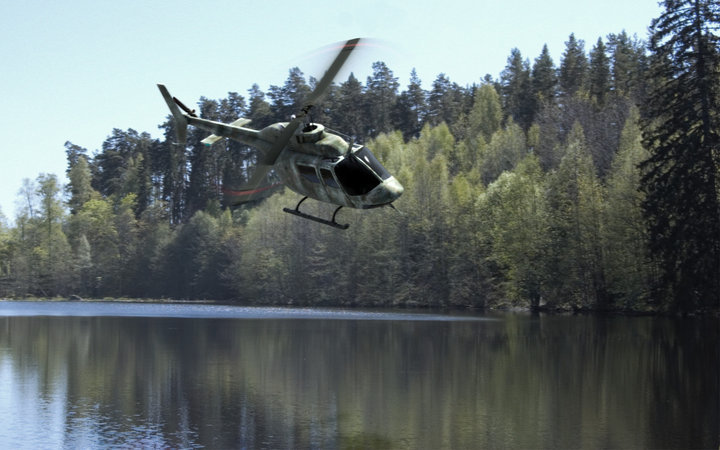
Illustration of a helicopter following a river to enable low level flight

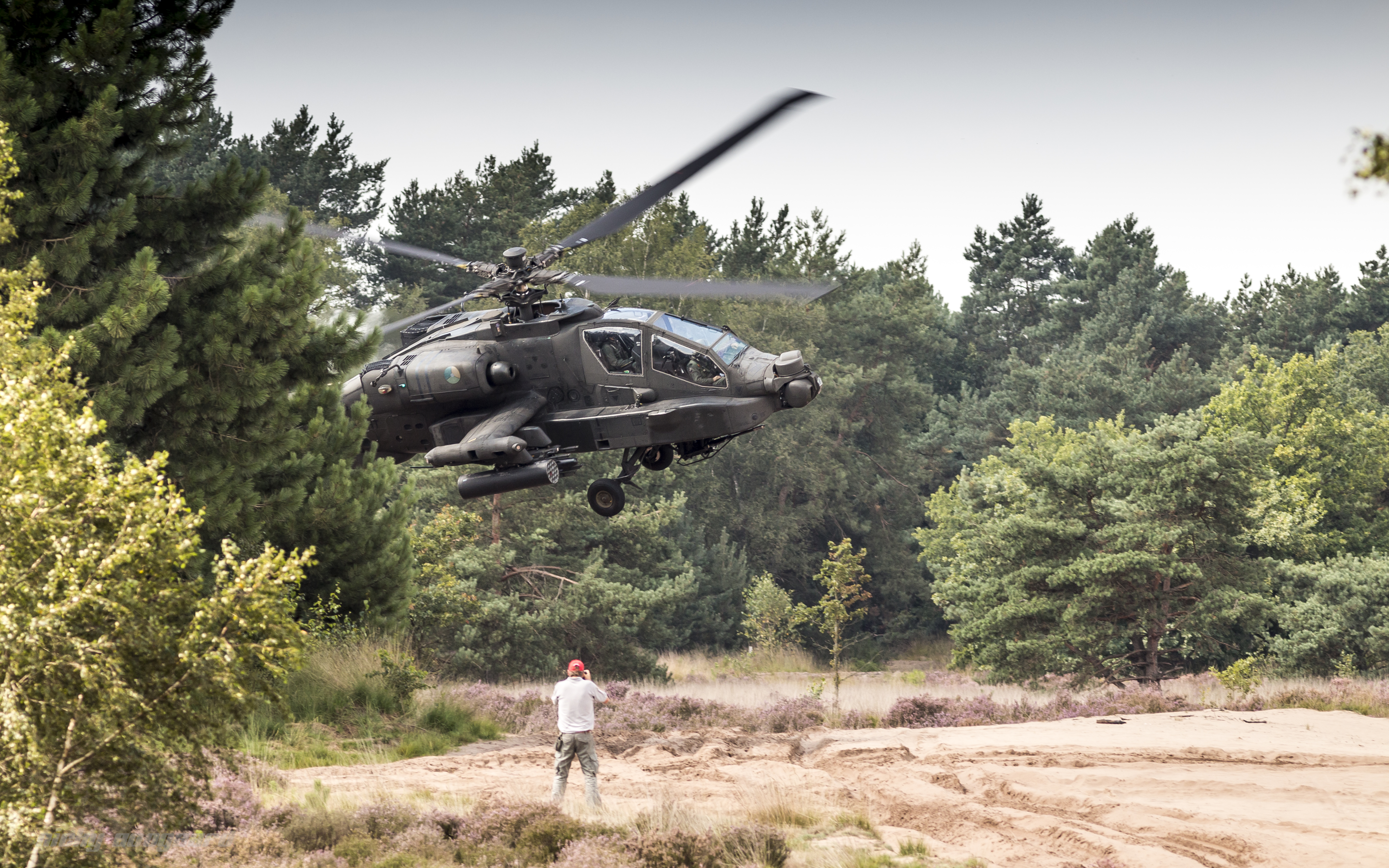
AH-64 Apache at the Oirschotse Heide Low Flying Area

The lowest NOE flying is by helicopters because they have lower speeds and more maneuverability than fixed-wing aircraft, particularly fast jets. Helicopters can fly at treetop levels or even below the height of surrounding trees where there are clear areas (such as in river gullies), flying under wires (such as electricity cables) rather than over them. Attack helicopters can hide behind trees or buildings, "popping up" with minimum exposure, just enough to use their (rotor mast-mounted) radar or other sensors and launch weapons. The required altitude depends on the type of terrain, such as low vegetation or low buildings, tree canopy layer of less than 45 m (148 ft), presence of tall buildings or concrete pylons with heights of up to 25 m (82 ft) international standard, or emergent tree layer canopy and lattice steel electricity pylons to 100 m (330 ft) being present. In populated areas with tall radio transmission towers, an altitude of 150 m (490 ft) above ground level applies.

== Height above ground level ==
Height above ground level in NOE and low flying generally vary with the aircraft speed, aircraft maneuverability and the ruggedness of the terrain. Helicopters are capable of flying with no more than a few feet of clearance below the helicopter's skids or wheels. Fast jets are more constrained and at a typical low-flying speed of 450 knots (830 km/h), 200 feet (61 m) is not unusual and 50 feet (15 m) is possible in relatively flat terrain. Power wires are a danger to all aircraft flying at low level and "wire strikes" are common, such as the 1998 Cavalese cable car crash. Special maps are produced that plot the routes of these wires but these are difficult to keep up-to-date, especially for foreign/enemy countries. Pilots are trained to scan for the pylons or power-poles that support these wires, because they can be seen at a distance where the wires themselves cannot.

== See also ==
- Low flying military training
- Low-altitude parachute-extraction system
- Radar altimeter
- Radar horizon
- Sea skimming (missiles)
- Terrain-following radar
- Wire strike protection system
