= Tail warning radar =

Group of aircraft radar systems

A tail warning radar, sometimes TW for short, was a short-lived class of aircraft-mounted radar systems used to provide warning of another aircraft approaching from the rear.

They were mostly used on World War II bombers, starting with the Monica system fit to Royal Air Force (RAF) heavy bombers starting in June 1942. The set was also produced in the US as the AN/APS-13, but used primarily on late-war fighter aircraft like the Republic P-47 and North American P-51. These had to be withdrawn over Europe in 1944 when it was learned the Luftwaffe was homing in on their signals using the Flensburg radar detector. A small number were then transferred to RAF de Havilland Mosquito night fighters to attract the German fighters, and when one was seen approaching the Mosquito would perform a controlled 180 degree turn that would result in the German aircraft in front of the Mosquito and centered in their radar. During the same time, the Luftwaffe began adding additional rearward-pointing antennas to their night fighters as an ad-hoc tail warning radar to provide some protection from these dreaded "Serrate" intruder flights.

Dedicated tail warning radars were used for a relatively short time, from late-WWII through the 1950s. After that time, the increasing speeds of aircraft and the ability to shoot from off-axis angles using air-to-air missiles eroded their usefulness. One of the last major uses was the Red Steer system on the V bombers, a long-range system that was used to help the electronics warfare officer properly time the use of jammers and chaff. Today, similar tasks are generally provided by passive receiver systems that listen for the signals from the interceptor aircraft's radars; such systems do not provide range information but are still useful while not giving off any signals of their own. These systems also have the advantage of working against air and ground radars, which became important as the main anti-aircraft threat moved to surface-to-air missiles (SAMs).

A new class of tail warning radars emerged in the 1980s, primarily as a counter to SAM fire. The AN/ALQ-153 was used on the Boeing B-52 G and H and Rockwell B-1B aircraft and saw action during the Gulf War.

The Automatic Gun Laying Turret used on Royal Air Force Avro Lancaster bombers combined tail warning with gun laying. Systems like these were found on many post-war bomber designs and are generally regarded as a separate class.

== See also ==
- Index of aviation articles

== Bibliography ==
- Rubin, Maurice (1963). Radar: The Electronic Eye. Chemical Publishing Company. p. 291. ISBN 9780820600871.
