= Terrain-following radar =

Radar used for extremely low level flight

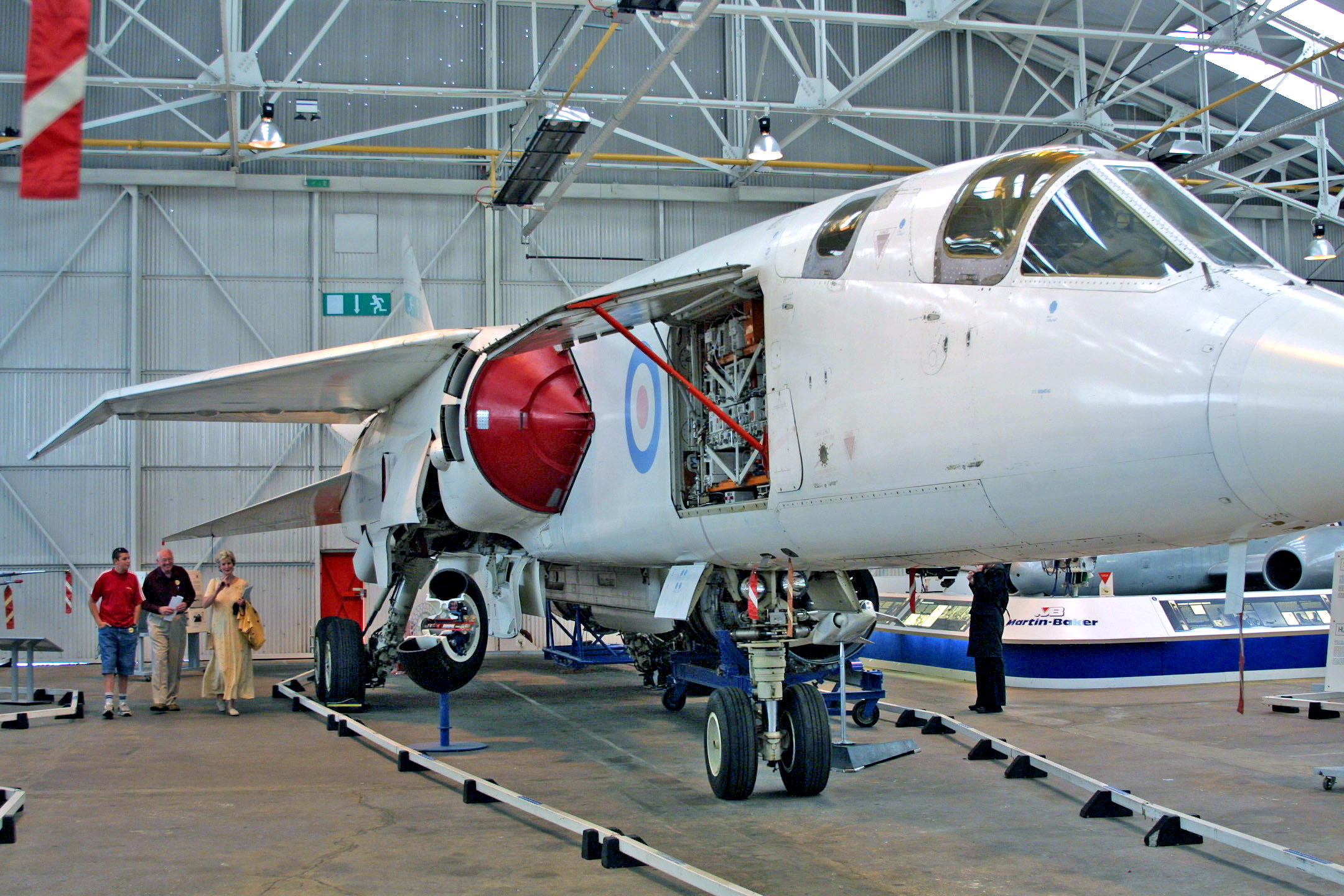
TSR-2 XR220 at RAF Museum Cosford, 2002. Ferranti developed the first terrain-following radar specifically for the TSR-2.

Terrain-following radar (TFR) is a military aerospace technology that allows a very-low-flying aircraft to automatically maintain a relatively constant altitude above ground level and therefore make detection by enemy radar more difficult. It is sometimes referred to as ground hugging or terrain hugging flight. The term nap-of-the-earth flight may also apply but is more commonly used in relation to low-flying military helicopters, which typically do not use terrain-following radar.

TFR systems work by scanning a radar beam vertically in front of the aircraft and comparing the range and angle of the radar reflections to a pre-computed ideal manoeuvring curve. By comparing the distance between the terrain and the ideal curve, the system calculates a manoeuvre that will make the aircraft clear the terrain by a pre-selected distance, often on the order of 100 metres (330 ft). Using TFR allows an aircraft to automatically follow terrain at very low levels and high speeds.

Terrain-following radars differ from the similar-sounding terrain avoidance radars; terrain avoidance systems scan horizontally to produce a map-like display that the navigator then uses to plot a route that avoids higher terrain features. The two techniques are often combined in a single radar system: the navigator uses the terrain avoidance mode to choose an ideal route through lower-altitude terrain features like valleys, and then switches to TFR mode which then flies over the chosen route at a minimum altitude. Another related technology is a terrain awareness and warning system, which works similarly to a TFR but uses a database of known terrain features and GPS locations instead of radar measurements.

The concept was initially developed at the Cornell Aeronautical Laboratory in the 1950s. It was first built in production form starting in 1959 by Ferranti for use with the TSR-2 aircraft, flying for the first time in an English Electric Canberra testbed in 1962. While the TSR-2 project was ultimately abandoned, the concept was widely deployed in 1960s and 70s strike aircraft and interdictors, including the General Dynamics F-111, Panavia Tornado and Sukhoi Su-24 "Fencer". The wider introduction of stealth aircraft technologies through the 1990s has led to a reduction in low-altitude flight as a solution to the problem of avoiding anti-aircraft weapons and the technique is no longer common. Most aircraft of this class have since retired although the Su-24 and Tornado remain in use in some numbers.

== Technology ==
The system works by transmitting a pencil beam radar signal towards the ground area in front of the aircraft while the radar scans up and down. The signal is sent as a series of brief pulses and the reflections of these pulses off the ground produces very powerful returns. The time the pulse takes to travel to and from the terrain produces a range measurement to the terrain in front of the aircraft. The angle relative to the aircraft is returned by a sensor on the vertical gimbal that returns a calibrated voltage.

Simplified operation of terrain-following radar: 1. / In a plot of altitude a and range r, the blue triangle denotes the aircraft, the blue curve Z its zero command line for clearance setting c, the green curve T the detected terrain (dotted parts are in radar shadow), and the black curve T−Z their difference. Its maximum (red arrow) being positive determines by how much the aircraft should climb.; 2. / If the aircraft flies higher, the maximum being negative determines by how much it should descend.

At the same time that the radar is sending out pulses, a function generator is producing a varying voltage representing a preferred manoeuvring curve. This is similar in shape to a ski jump ramp, flat under the aircraft and then curving upward in front of it. The curve represents the path the aircraft would take if it was manoeuvring at a constant g-force, while the flat area under the aircraft extends forward a short distance to represent the distance the aircraft moves in a straight line before starting that manoeuvre due to control lag. The resulting compound curve is displaced by a pilot-selected desired clearance distance.

The timing of the pulses is much faster than the vertical scanning, so for any one pulse the angle is fixed. When then pulse is sent, the function generator is triggered. When the return is seen, the system sums the output from the generator at that instant with the output from the angle sensor on the radar. The resulting voltage represents the angle between the actual and preferred location. If the voltage is positive, that means the terrain lies above the curve, negative means it is below. This difference is known as the angle error.

To guide the aircraft, a series of these measurements are taken over the period of one complete vertical scan out to some maximum distance on the order of 10 kilometres (6.2 mi). The maximum positive or minimum negative value of the angle error during the scan is recorded. That voltage is a representation of the change in pitch angle the aircraft needs to fly at to keep itself at the desired clearance altitude above the terrain while manoeuvring at the selected load factor. This can be fed into an autopilot or displayed on the pilot's heads-up display. This process produces a continually computed path that rises and falls over the terrain with a constant manoeuvring load.

One problem with this simple algorithm is that the calculated path will keep the aircraft in positive pitch as it approaches the crest of a hill. This results in the aircraft flying over the peak while still climbing and taking some time before it begins to descend again into the valley beyond. This effect was known as "ballooning". To address this, real-world units had an additional term that was applied that caused the aircraft to climb more rapidly against larger displacements. This resulted in the aircraft reaching the desired clearance altitude earlier than normal and thus levelling off before reaching the peak.

Because the radar only sees objects in the line-of-sight, it cannot see hills behind other hills. To prevent the aircraft from diving into a valley only to require a hard pull-up, the negative G limit was generally low, on the order of one-half G. The systems also had problems over water, where the radar beam tended to scatter forward and returned little signal to the aircraft except in high sea states. In such conditions, the system would fail back to a constant clearance using a radio altimeter.

Terrain avoidance normally works in a relative fashion; that is, the absolute altitudes of objects are not important. In some cases, it is desirable to provide an absolute number to indicate the amount of clearance or lack of it. The height of the top of any particular feature relative to the aircraft can then be calculated through h = H - R sin φ, where H is the altitude over the ground measured by the radio altimeter, φ is the angle and R the range measured by the radar, with h being the resulting height of the object over the current flight path. The clearance between the aircraft and terrain is then H - h.

== History ==
=== Initial work at Cornell ===
The TFR concept traces its history to studies carried out at the Cornell Aeronautical Laboratory for the USAF Aeronautical Systems Division. This led to the development of a system known as "Autoflite."

Early radars installed in aircraft used conical scanning systems with beamwidths on the order of four degrees. When the beam hits the ground, some of the signal scatters back toward the aircraft, allowing it to measure the distance to the ground in front of it. When looking downwards at an angle, the near and far side of the radar's circular beam was spread out into an ellipse on the ground. The return from this pattern produced a "blip" that was similarly spread out on the radar display and not accurate enough for terrain avoidance. It was, however, accurate enough to produce a low-resolution map-like display of the ground below the aircraft, leading to the wartime development of the H2S radar.

To provide the accuracy required for terrain following, TFR systems have to be based on the monopulse radar concept. The monopulse technique produces a beam of the same width as a traditional design, but adds additional information in the radio signal, often using polarization, which results in two separate signals being sent in slightly different directions while overlapping in the center. When the signals are received, the receiver uses this extra information to separate the signals back out again. When these signals are oriented vertically, the signal from the lower beam hits the ground closer to the aircraft, producing a spread-out blip as in the case of earlier radars, while the upper beam produces a similar blip but located at a slightly further distance. The two blips overlap to produce an extended ellipse.

The key feature of the monopulse technique is that the signals overlap in a very specific way; if you invert one of the signals and then sum them, the result is a voltage output that looks something like a sine wave. The exact midpoint of the beam is where the voltage crosses zero. This results in a measurement that is both precisely aligned with the midline of the signal and is easily identified using simple electronics. The range can then be accurately determined by timing the precise moment when the zero-crossing occurs. Accuracies on the order of a meter for measurements of objects kilometers away are commonly achieved.

=== Development in the UK ===
The Cornell reports were picked up in the UK where they formed the basis of an emerging concept for a new strike aircraft, which would eventually emerge as the BAC TSR-2. The TSR-2 project was officially started with the release of GOR.339 in 1955, and quickly settled on the use of TFR to provide the required low-level performance. The Royal Aircraft Establishment built a simulator of the system using discrete electronics that filled a room.

During this same period, the Royal Air Force was introducing its newest interceptor aircraft, the English Electric Lightning. The Lightning was equipped with the world's first airborne monopulse radar, the AIRPASS system developed by Ferranti in Edinburgh. In the case of the Lightning, the monopulse signal was used to accurately measure the horizontal angle, in order to allow the AIRPASS computer to plot an efficient intercept course at long range. For TFR use, all that had to change was that the antenna would be rotated so it measured the vertical angle instead of horizontal.

Unsurprisingly, Ferranti won the contract for the radar component sometime in 1957 or 58. Shortly after the project started, in 1959 the project lead, Gus Scott, left for Hughes Microcircuits in nearby Glenrothes, and the team was taken over by Greg Stewart and Dick Starling. The initial system was built from a surplus AI.23B AIRPASS, and could be mounted to a trailer and towed by a Land Rover for testing. A significant issue is that the amount of signal returned varies greatly with the terrain; a building's vertical walls produces a partial corner cube that returns a signal that is about 10 million times stronger than the signal from sand or dry ground. To deal with the rapidly changing signals, an automatic gain control with 100 dB of range was developed.

The beamwidth of the radar was small enough that objects to either side of the aircraft's flight path might be a potential hazard if the aircraft was blown sideways or started a turn close to the object. To avoid this, the radar scanned in an O-shaped pattern, scanning vertically from 8 degrees over the flight path to 12 degrees below it, while moving a few degrees left and right of the flight path. Additionally, the system read turn rates from the instruments and moved the scanning pattern further left or right to measure the terrain where the aircraft would be in the future.

Tests of the system were initially carried out using Ferranti Test Flight's existing DC-3 Dakota. Starting over the winter of 1961/62, tests move to an English Electric Canberra. The test aircraft carried cameras looking in various directions, including some looking at the aircraft instruments and radar displays. This allowed the system to be extensively examined on the ground after the flight. Each flight returned data for flights over about 100 miles, and over 250 such flights were carried out. Early tests showed random noise in the measurements which rendered the measurements useless. This was eventually traced to the automatic gain control using very high gain while at the top of the scanning pattern where the terrain was normally at long distances and required the most amplification. This had the side-effect of making spurious reflections in the antenna's side lobes being amplified to the point of causing interference. This was addressed by moving from an O-shaped pattern to a U-shaped one, and only allowing the gain to increase when scanning upward to prevent it from re-adjusting to high gain when moving downward and thereby avoiding low-lying terrain appearing in the sidelobes with high gain.

Advances in electronics during development allowed the original vacuum tube electronics to be increasingly transistorized, producing a much smaller system overall. (Note: See images page 13. The system is about half as large as the original AIRPASS unit.) As the system was further developed it was moved to a Blackburn Buccaneer for higher-speed testing. The tests were carried out from RAF Turnhouse at the Edinburgh Airport, close to Ferranti's radar development site in the city.

During testing, the radar was not connected to the aircraft's autopilot system and all control was manual. The curve was chosen to produce a one-half G maximum load. (Note: None of the existing sources are clear whether this was both positive and negative load, or just negative. The value is smaller than production unit's positive loads, but typical for negative.) The path to fly was indicated by a dot in an AIRPASS heads-up display. The pilot followed the computed path by pitching until the aircraft's velocity vector indicator, a small ring, was centred around the dot. In tests, the pilots very quickly became confident in the system and were happy to fly it at the minimum clearance setting even in bad weather.

As the pilots became familiar with the system, the engineers continually reduced the selected clearance downward until it demonstrated its ability to safely and smoothly operate at an average of only 30 metres (98 ft) clearance. This was tested against rough terrain, including mountain ridges, blind valleys and even cliff faces. It was also found to properly guide over artificial objects like the television antennas at Cairn O' Mounth and the Kirk o' Shotts transmitting station, bridges over the River Forth, and overhead power lines.

=== Development in the US ===
Despite the early start of Cornell's work, for reasons that are not well recorded, further development in the US ended for a time with the concept in a semi-complete form. This changed dramatically after the 1960 U-2 incident, which led to the rapid switch from high-altitude flying over the USSR to the low-altitude "penetrator" approach. In the short term, a number of terrain avoidance radars were introduced for a variety of aircraft. The first true TFR in the US was the Texas Instruments AN/APQ-101, which launched the company as the market leader in TFR for many years. In the early 1960s, they developed TFR systems for the RF-4C version of the Phantom II, the Army's Grumman OV-1 Mohawk, and the advanced AN/APQ-110 system for the General Dynamics F-111.

For a variety of reasons, the TSR-2 project was cancelled in 1965 in favor of purchasing the F-111, a platform of similar concept based around a similar radar. In contrast to Ferranti's design, the APQ-110 offered several additional controls, including a ride quality setting for "hard", "soft" and "medium" that changed the G force of the calculated curve's descent profile from 0.25 to 1 G, while always allowing a maximum 3 G pullup. It also included a second set of electronics to provide hot-backup in case the primary unit failed, and fail-safe modes that executed the 3 G pullup in the case of various system failures.

=== Spread ===
Ultimately the F-111 ran into delays and cost overruns not unlike the TSR-2. After examining several concepts, the RAF eventually decided to use the Buccaneer. Although this platform had been extensively tested with the Ferranti radar, this potential upgrade was not selected for service. Unhappiness with this state of affairs led the RAF to begin discussions with their French counterparts and the emergence of the BAC/Dassault AFVG, an aircraft very similar to the F-111. After successful initial negotiations, the UK dropped its options on the F-111K. Shortly thereafter, Marcel Dassault began to actively undermine the project, which the French eventually abandoned in 1967.

The next year, the UK government began negotiations with a wider selection of countries, leading eventually to the Panavia Tornado. Texas Instruments used their experience with the F-111 TFR to win the radar contract for the Tornado IDS.

== Use in strike aircraft ==
=== Advantages and disadvantages ===
Terrain following radar is primarily used by military strike aircraft, to enable flight at very low altitudes (sometimes below 100 feet/30 metres) and high speeds. Since radar detection by enemy radars and interception by anti-aircraft systems require a line of sight to the target, flying low to the ground and at high speed reduces the time that an aircraft is vulnerable to detection to a minimum by hiding the aircraft behind terrain as far as possible. This is known as terrain masking.

However, radar emissions can be detected by enemy anti-aircraft systems with relative ease once there is no covering terrain, allowing the aircraft to be targeted. The use of terrain-following radar is therefore a compromise between the increased survivability due to terrain masking and the ease with which the aircraft can be targeted if it is seen.

Even an automated system has limitations, and all aircraft with terrain-following radars have limits on how low and fast they can fly. Factors such as system response-time, aircraft g-limits and the weather can all limit an aircraft. Since the radar cannot tell what is beyond any immediate terrain, the flight path may also suffer from "ballooning" over sharp terrain ridges, where the altitude becomes unnecessarily high. Furthermore, obstacles such as radio antennas and electricity pylons may be detected late by the radar and present collision hazards.

=== Integration and use ===
On aircraft with more than one crew, the radar is normally used by the navigator and this allows the pilot to focus on other aspects of the flight besides the extremely intensive task of low flying itself. Most aircraft allow the pilot to also select the ride "hardness" with a cockpit switch, to choose between how closely the aircraft tries to keep itself close to the ground and the forces exerted on the pilot.

Some aircraft such as the Tornado IDS have two separate radars, with the smaller one used for terrain-following. However, more modern aircraft such as the Rafale with phased array radars have a single antenna that can be used to look forward and at the ground, by electronically steering the beams.

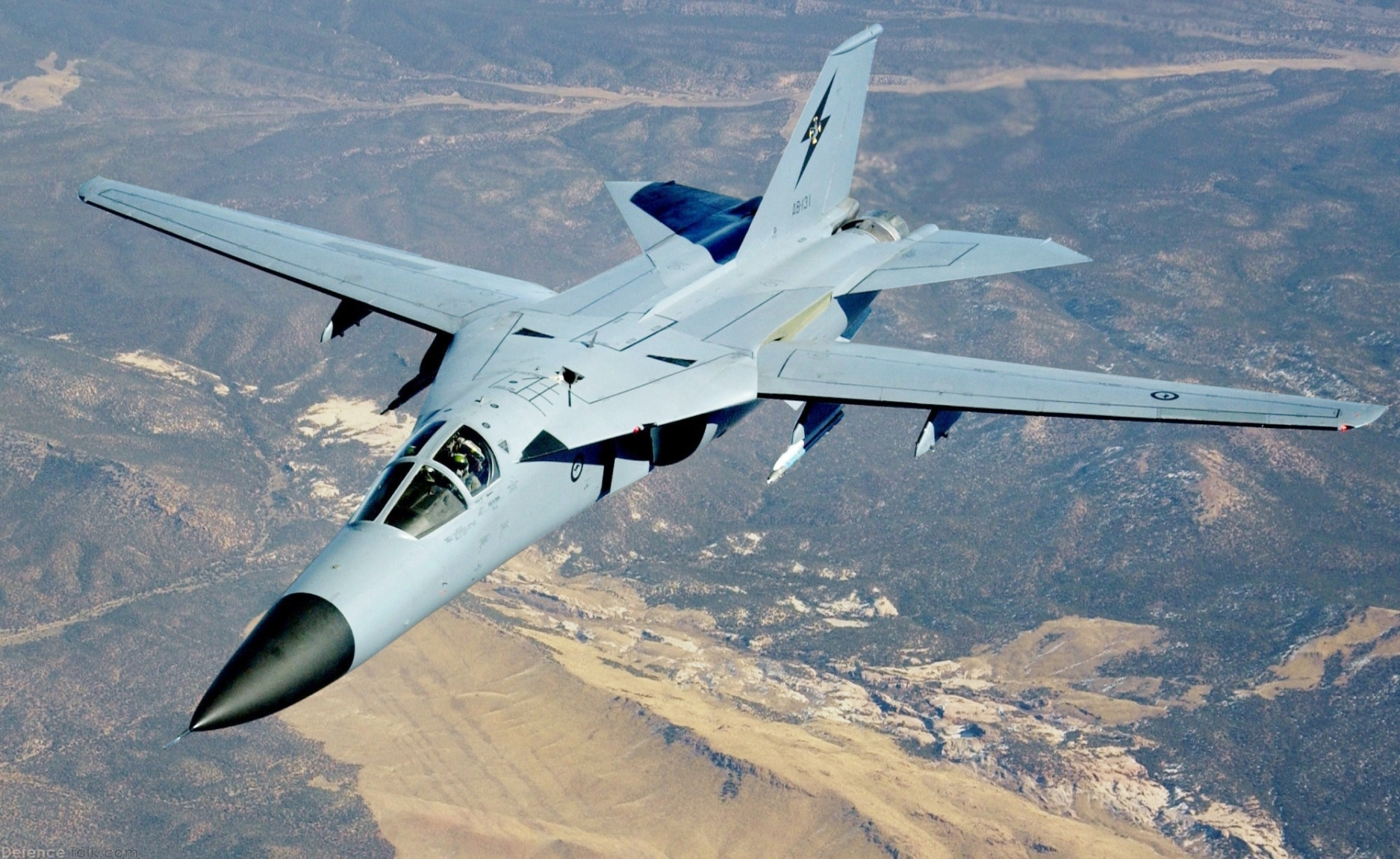
The F-111C employs TFR

== Other uses ==
Terrain-following radar is sometimes used by civilian aircraft that map the ground and wish to maintain a constant height over it.

Military helicopters may also have terrain-following radar. Due to their lower speed and high maneuverability, helicopters are normally able to fly lower than fixed-wing aircraft.

Systems are now available that mount to commercial UAV's, allowing the carriage of Ground Penetrating Radar or magnetometry sensors for sub-surface survey. This is being exploited in finding unexploded ordnance and in archaeology.

== Alternatives ==
There are very few alternatives to using terrain-following radar for high-speed, low altitude flight. TERPROM, a terrain-referenced navigation system provides a limited but passive terrain-following functionality.

== See also ==
- Phased array
- Active electronically scanned array
