= AIRPASS =

British interceptor radar/avionics system

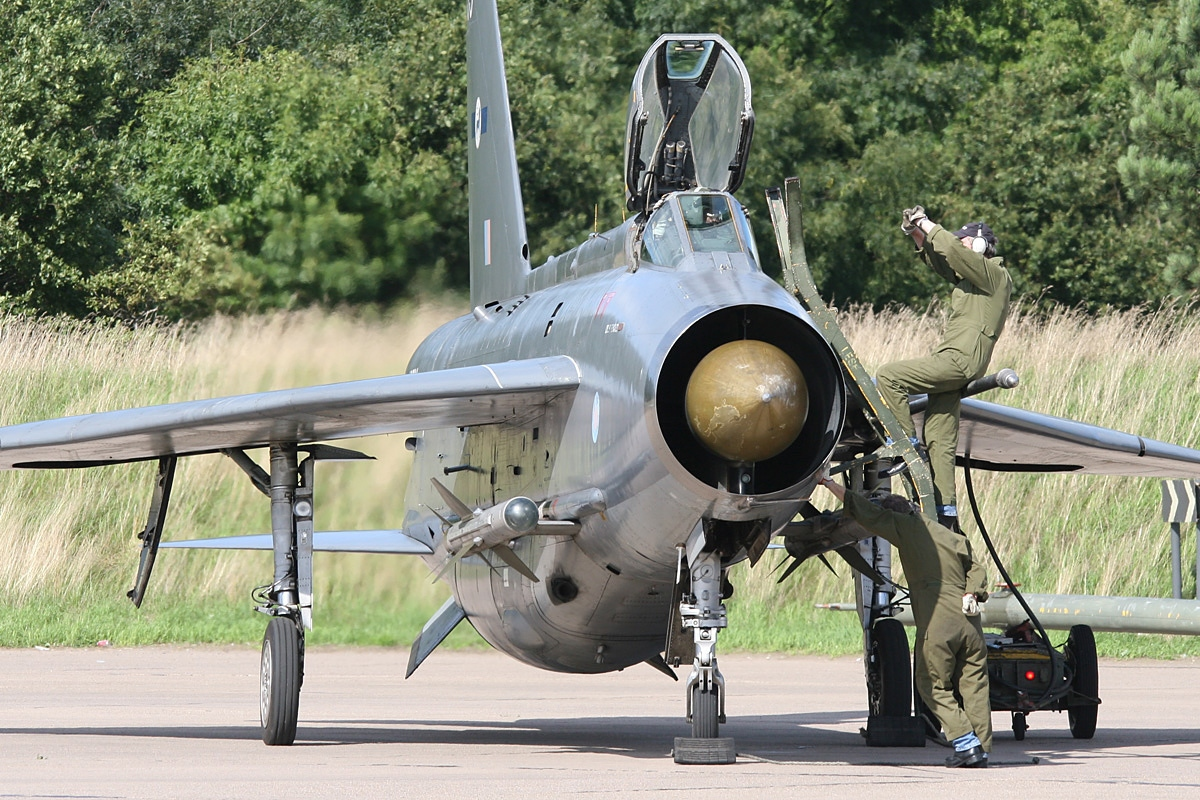
The AIRPASS radar sat within the air intake of the Lightning, behind a radome serving double duty as a shock cone.

AIRPASS was a British aircraft interception radar and fire-control radar system developed by Ferranti. It was the world's first airborne monopulse radar system and fed data to the world's first head-up display. The name is an acronym for "Aircraft Interception Radar and Pilot's Attack Sight System". In the Royal Air Force (RAF) it was given the official name Radar, Aircraft Interception, Mark 23, normally shortened to AI.23. AIRPASS was used on the English Electric Lightning throughout its lifetime.

The basic AIRPASS electronics system was later adapted as the basis for a terrain-following radar for navigation and targeting for air-to-ground attacks. This AIRPASS II was originally intended for the BAC TSR.2, but when that aircraft was cancelled in 1965, it was subsequently used in the Blackburn Buccaneer. Elements of the AIRPASS design were used on many subsequent radars from Ferranti, while its head-up display was licensed for use in the United States, where it was quickly adopted for many aircraft.

== History ==
Development of the monopulse radar underlying AIRPASS began in 1951 at Ferranti's Ferry Road location in Edinburgh. The AIRPASS system was announced to the public in late June 1958. It was initially tested on Douglas DC-3 TS423 (later civilian registered as G-DAKS) and later on an English Electric Canberra WJ643 for higher speed trials, replacing the nose sections of these aircraft. After testing use, WJ643 was renamed T.Mk 11 and used as a trainer aircraft for the radar operators of the Gloster Javelin. Several further T.Mk 11 were produced, but these mounted the AI.17 from the Javelin. The first flight on the English Electric Lightning took place on airframe XG312 on 29 December 1958.

It was initially linked to the de Havilland Firestreak air-to-air missile. It introduced the HOTAS system whereby the radar and gun sight controls were situated on the control column and throttle lever instead of elsewhere in the cockpit, eliminating the need for the pilot to take his hands off the controls while making an interception. The radar entered service with the RAF in 1960 in the English Electric Lightning interceptor.

The next version of the system was called AIRPASS II, codenamed Blue Parrot, and was a system optimised for use at low-level and originally developed for the cancelled BAC TSR.2 and subsequently used in the Blackburn Buccaneer.

== Design ==
AIRPASS was based on a magnetron source which provided pulses of about 100 kW peak. Pulses were about one microsecond in duration and sent 1000 times a second. To make the system as compact as possible, Ferranti invested in a numerical control system to mill the waveguides from single blocks of aluminium. The signal was sent and received from feedhorns that were split vertically to produce two outputs, one on either side of the reflector centerline. The reflector was shaped as two partial paraboloids, so that the two signals re-combined in space in front of the aircraft. The entire assembly was mounted on a servo system that allowed the antenna assembly to be pointed in two dimensions.

On reception of a pulse, the signal was sent into a klystron local oscillator and then into two conventional superheterodyne receivers with an intermediate frequency of 30 MHz. The monopulse technique requires the signals from the two channels to be compared in strength, so the output of the amplifiers must be precisely matched. This was accomplished with a highly advanced automatic gain control system with 100 dB range that adjusted the pulse-to-pulse outputs. To this point the system was entirely analogue, using miniaturized vacuum tubes cooled by forced air.

Behind the analog section was the analog computer portion of the system. This took the outputs from the radar system, calculated the proper intercept course based on the selected weapon, and presented the results in the reflector gunsight mechanism. The system also read data from various aircraft systems like the altimeter and air speed indicator and combined this into the same display. The result was the world's first heads-up display, a concept that was soon licensed by US manufacturers.

AIRPASS had an average detection range against a Tupolev Tu-95 "Bear" bomber of about 40 miles (64 km). This was more than enough to allow the Lightning to be directed into the general area of the target through ground controlled interception and then use AIRPASS to hunt it down. Some consideration was given to sending the aircraft into the right area using commands sent from the ground to the aircraft's autopilot, allowing the pilot to concentrate solely on their radar display, but this project was ultimately cancelled.

Later models, the AI.23B, added additional small antennas for S-band reception of signals from ground based radars. This allowed the aircraft to seek out targets with its own radar transmitter turned off. The signal was displayed in A-scope fashion along the bottom of the radar display, which the pilot could use to seek out targets while under ground direction. When a peak of the required height appeared, the pilot would take over the approach and then turn on their own radar when the conditions appeared correct. This allowed the aircraft to make accurate approaches without signalling their presence or inviting jamming from the target. The same system was used in the E/F-band to provide home-on-jam.

== AIRPASS II ==
In the late 1950s, Ferranti won the contract to supply radars for the Blackburn Buccaneer aircraft in Royal Navy service. This version, AIRPASS II (also known by the rainbow codename Blue Parrot), was modified to handle low-level scanning by eliminating the reflections from waves. Since the waves reflected away much of the signal, to make up for these losses the new version used a more powerful 250 kW transmitter and a larger Cassegrain antenna.

During tests of the monopulse systems, Ferranti engineers noticed that the systems produced high quality ranging information of ground reflections. Older systems without monopulse processing made the determination of range difficult as the radar returned signals were from the entire beamwidth, meaning that it received signals that were from the ground that was closer and further from the aircraft. Monopulse processing allowed the beam to be discriminated vertically and thus range against a single feature very accurately.

The ability of the radar to produce highly accurate range measurements, combined with a system that displayed the resulting data as a map, opened the possibility of producing a terrain-following radar guidance system. Ferranti developed this concept extensively through the 1960s, first with their Dakota and Canberra aircraft, and later with the Buccaneer.

The idea was simple; the computer calculated a ski-ramp shaped ideal trajectory, flat directly under the aircraft and then sloping upward in a gentle curve. This pattern is rotated to follow the aircraft's velocity vector. The radar scanned in a U-shaped pattern, taking accurate measurements of the altitude and range to objects in front and slightly to either side of the aircraft. The computer compared the range and altitude of objects in the radar to the pre-calculated path, and then rotated the path so that the terrain feature would be overflown at a pre-set altitude between 60 and 300 metres (200 and 980 ft). This was relayed to the pilot as a dot in the heads-up display, and by following the dot the aircraft would attempt to maintain the selected altitude by continually raising or lowering the dot as the terrain moved. The ski-shaped curve was selected to ensure any required manoeuvres were half-gee, lowering loads on the crew.

The concept became the basis for the ill-fated BAC TSR-2 project, which used another modified version of the AIRPASS hardware, now extensively transistorized.

As part of a proposal for the Swiss Air Force, Saab AB modified a single Saab 35 Draken by replacing its relatively simple radar system with an AIRPASS II radar. This produced the Saab J35H (H for Helvetia), but the contract was ultimately won by the Mirage III.

== Structure ==
The radar of AIRPASS I weighed around 90 kg.

== See also ==
- Radar configurations and types
- Aircraft interception radar
- Ferranti Blue Fox
