= Radar horizon =

Distance at which ground targets are hidden

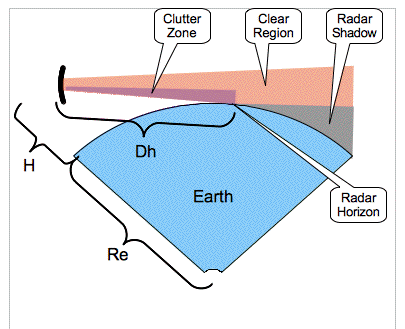
Radar horizon.

The radar horizon is a critical area of performance for aircraft detection systems, defined by the distance at which the radar beam rises enough above the Earth's surface to make detection of a target at the lowest level possible. It is associated with the low elevation region of performance, and its geometry depends on terrain, radar height, and signal processing. This concept is associated with the notions of radar shadow, the clutter zone, and the clear zone.

Airborne objects can exploit the radar shadow zone and clutter zone to avoid radar detection by using a technique called nap-of-the-earth navigation.

== Definition ==
Without taking into account the refraction through the atmosphere, the radar horizon would be the geometrical distance $D_h$ from the radar to the horizon only taking into account the height $H$ of the radar above sea-level, and the radius of the earth $R_e$ (approximately 6.4·10^{3} km):

$D_h = \sqrt{2 \times H \times R_e + H^2}$

When H is small compared to $R_e$, this can be approximated by:

$$D_h = \sqrt{2 \times H \times R_e}$$

[The percentage error, which increases roughly in proportion to the height, is less than 1% when H is less than 250 km.]

With this calculation, the horizon for a radar at a 1-mile (1.6 km) altitude is 89-mile (143 km). The radar horizon with an antenna height of 75 feet (23 m) over the ocean is 10-mile (16 km). However, since the pressure and water vapor content of the atmosphere varies with height, the path used by the radar beam is refracted by the change in density. With a standard atmosphere, electromagnetic waves are generally bent or refracted downward. This reduces the shadow zone, but causes errors in distance and height measuring. In practice, to find $D_h$, one must be using a value of 8.5·10^{3} km for the effective Earth's radius $R_e$ (4/3 of it), instead of the real one.

So the equation becomes:

$$D_h = \sqrt{2 \times H \times \left( \frac {4R_e}{3} \right)}$$

And for the same examples : the radar horizon for the radar at a 1-mile (1.6 km) altitude will be 102-mile (164 km) and the one at 75 feet (23 m) will be 12-mile (19 km).

Furthermore, layers with an inverse trend of temperature or humidity cause atmospheric ducting, which bends the beam downward or even traps radio waves so that they do not spread out vertically. This phenomenon occurs in two circumstances:

- A thin stable layer of elevated humidity
- Stable temperature inversion

Ducting influence becomes stronger as frequency drops. Below 3 MHz, the whole volume of the air acts as a waveguide to fill in the radar shadow and also reduces radar sensitivity above the duct zone. Ducting fills in the shadow zone, extends the distance of the clutter zone, and can create reflections for low PRF radar that are beyond the instrumented range.

== Limiting factors ==
=== Shadow Zone ===
Objects beyond Dh will be visible only if the height satisfies the following requirement:

$$H_T > \frac{ \left( R_T - \sqrt{2 \times H \times R_e } \right)^2 }{2 \times R_e}$$

where $H_T$ is the target height and $R_T$ is the target range. Objects below this height are in the radar shadow.

=== Clutter Zone ===
The Clutter Zone is where radar energy is in the lowest several thousand feet of air. This extends to a distance of about 120% of the radar horizon.

There are a large number of reflectors on the ground at these elevation angles. Prevailing winds of about 15 mile/hour cause these reflectors to move, and this wind stirs up smaller objects into the air. This interference is called clutter.

The clutter zone includes the littoral zone and terrain when operating on or near land.

A beam $1^o$ wide will illuminate millions of square feet of surface by the time the radar pulse reaches 10 miles (16 km). Targets are generally much smaller, so will be masked by clutter. Clutter reflections can create unwanted false targets.

The antenna for radar with no signal processing clutter-reduction improvement is not normally aimed near the ground to avoid overwhelming computers and users.

Moving Target Indication (MTI) can reduce clutter by about 35 dB. This allows objects as small as 1,000 square feet (93 m^{2}) to be detected. Prevailing wind and weather can degrade MTI performance, and MTI introduces blind velocities.

Pulse-Doppler radar can reduce clutter by over 60 dB, which can allow objects smaller than 1-square-foot (0.093 m^{2}) to be detected without overloading computers and users. Systems using pulse-Doppler signal processing with speed rejection set above the wind speed have no clutter zone. This means that the clear region extends all the way to the ground.

=== Clear Region ===
The Clear Region is the zone that begins several kilometers beyond the radar horizon at low elevation angles.

The clear region is also the zone above low elevation angles with clear skies.

There is no clear region in areas with weather and heavy biological activity (rain, snow, hail, high winds, and migration).

== Over-the-horizon ==
A number of radar systems have been developed that allow detection of targets in the shadow zone. These systems are collectively known as over-the-horizon radars. Three systems are generally used; the most common uses the ionosphere as a reflector and beams the signal skyward and then listens for the tiny signals that are returned from the sky, others use a bistatic arrangement with distant antennas looking for objects that pass between them, and a small number of systems use "creeping waves" that travel into the shadow zone.

== See also ==
- Line-of-sight propagation
- Hull-down
