= Envelope (radar) =

Radar envelope is a critical Measure of Performance (MOP) identified in the Test and Evaluation Master Plan (TEMP). This is the volume of space where a radar system is required to reliably detect an object with a specific size and speed. This is one of the requirements that must be evaluated as part of the acceptance testing process.

Radar systems have natural deficiencies because the laws of physics create performance constraints that cannot be altered. The ambiguity function associated with pulse compression and scalloping associated with moving target indication are two examples.

Complete coverage requires radar at multiple locations and multiple different kinds of radar.

== Definition ==
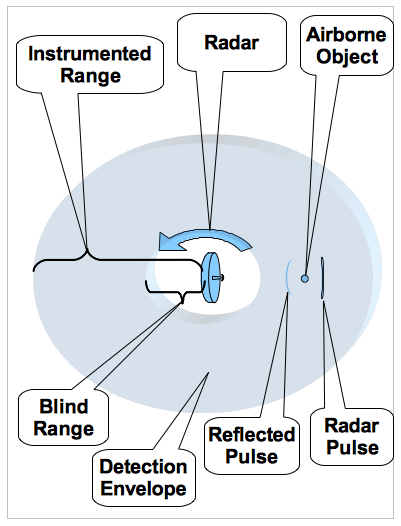
The radar envelope describes the region where a specific level of performance is required.

Radar system specifications require a specific level of performance within a specific radar envelope. This performance includes the following characteristics.

- Cross section
- Blind range
- Radial velocity
- Instrumented range
- Scan time
- Altitude
- Elevation angle
- Bearing coverage
- Sidelobe performance

Data is extracted and recorded from the radar system while aircraft, balloons, ships, drones, missiles or other objects are moved within the radar envelope. The recorded data is compared to distance, altitude, and speed of the objects to evaluate the pass-fail criteria.

These are the typical shapes of the physical radar envelope.

- Flattened donut
- Cylinder with spherical void near the center
- Disk with spherical void near the center
- Pie with a missing slice and spherical void near the center

=== Cross-section ===
The cross-section is the minimum apparent surface area observed in the direction of the radar that must be detectable.

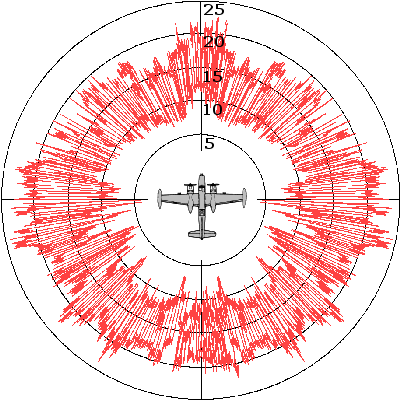
Radar cross section changes with aspect angle.

Cross section for anything except a perfect sphere depends upon the aspect angle, which how far the reflector is rotated with respect to the radar pulse.

=== Blind range ===
The blind range for a radar system is the distance occupied by the transmit pulse and the setup time for the receiver.

$$\text{Blind range} = 0.5 \times c \times (\text{Transmit pulse width} + \text{Setup time}),$$

where $c$ is the speed of light in the medium. Monostatic radars are blind for the duration of the transmit pulse.

Setup time is associated with two devices.

- Branch-duplexer receiver protection
- Antenna beamforming

The branch-duplexer often includes a gas-filled tube that has high attenuation for high power microwaves but no attenuation for low power microwaves. This produces microwave noise during the setup-time at the end of the transmit pulse.

Phased-array antennas use phase shifters that require adjustment after the end of the transmit pulse, and these phase shifters create modulation and high sidelobes that corrupts receive signals until after the setup time. Active phased-array radar may not have this limitation.

Nap-of-the-earth flying techniques can be used to avoid detection when the blind range exceeds the radar horizon.

$$Height < \frac{c^2 \times (Transmit \ Pulse \ Width + Setup \ Time)^2}{8 \times Earth \ Radius}$$

=== Radial velocity ===
Radial velocity is the speed along the line of sight of toward the radar and away from the radar. This kind of motion degrades cross section performance due to the following phenomenon.

- Scalloping
- Doppler ambiguity function
- Moving target indication blind velocities

=== Instrumented range ===
The instrumented range is the maximum distance at which a radar return may be displayed. This does not indicate an object will be detected at this range, but merely that beyond this range no returns will be displayed at all.

=== Scan time ===
The scan time is the time between re-scan of the same volume. For example, if a radar rotates at a fixed speed of 4 RPM, then the scan time is 15 seconds (60/4).

Scan time performance interacts with high-speed objects. Excessive scan time allows high-speed objects to travel a large distance toward the radar without being detected.

=== Altitude ===
Altitude is the distance from the earth surface. This measure of performance interacts with elevation angle.

The Kármán line is generally accepted as the boundary between air and space. This is 100 km (62.5 mile).

There are two difficulties associated with altitude.

The first difficulty is that the Outer Space Treaty requires international disclosure for space operations. This can include RF emissions from radar systems that can observe objects in space.

The second difficulty is that there are millions of objects in low Earth orbit. Reflections from distances beyond the instrumented range can degrade performance.

=== Elevation angle ===
The elevation angle performance of a radar is determined by the type of antenna.

==== High elevation ====
The antenna panels used with phased array radar may be designed with an overlap that fills in any gap above a fully operational radar.

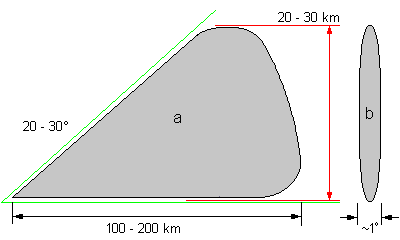
Fan beam antenna pattern

The radiation pattern of a rotating truncated parabolic antenna for radar fixed pedestal has a fan shaped beam with a vertical gap in coverage. Objects located directly above the radar may not be detected.

==== Low elevation ====
Low elevation is a unique performance region. Pulse-Doppler radar and Continuous-wave radar are required for high performance in this area because these exclude low-velocity reflections.

This is a critical measure of performance for the Littoral zone and land-based radar.

Prevailing winds of about 15 mile/hour cover most of the surface of the earth. This constantly stirs up debris into the lowest several thousand feet of air, and each piece of debris creates a separate reflection. This is called the clutter load. Clutter is reduced over the surface of the open ocean far from land.

A large number of reflections will overwhelm computing systems and humans. The typical solution is to limit the main lobe of the antenna beam so that it does not point near the ground. This is called the low-elevation limit. This creates a blind zone that can be exploited using nap-of-the-earth flying techniques to avoid detection. Weather phenomenon increases the low-elevation of the radar system.

Moving target indication (MTI) is used to improve the low-elevation limit. MTI creates blind velocities associated with radar scalloping. This reduces radar sensitivity at certain radial velocities, but MTI allows the main lobe of the antenna beam to be aimed closer to the ground. Wind speed above about 5 mile/hour moves debris fast enough to create excessive clutter load, which eliminates most of the MTI improvement.

=== Bearing coverage ===
Bearing coverage of a radar is determined by any nearby obstructions that may interfere with the radar antenna.

On ships, this could be caused by the mast. On land, this could be caused by buildings or terrain.

=== Sidelobe performance ===
Antenna side-lobes impact performance.

Reflections from large objects and stray electronic emissions may enter the radar antenna from a sidelobe. This degrades performance for nearby objects.

Sidelobe suppression strategies are sometimes used to improve this measure of performance.
