= JY-9 Radar =

JY-9
- Country of origin: People's Republic of China
- Introduced: unknown
- No. built: unknown
- Type: Fire Control
- Frequency: S band
- PRF: 790 Hz
- Pulsewidth: 20 μs
- RPM: 6, 12 rpm
- Range: 150 km (Pd=80%; Swerling I; 2 m^{2})
- Altitude: 10 km
- Diameter: 4.14 x 6.96 m
- Azimuth: 0-360°
- Elevation: 0-40°
- Precision: 120 - 140 m; azimuth 1.3°
- Power: 200 kW (peak)

The JY-9 Radar is a mobile S band low altitude search radar intended for use in air defense, gap filling, airport surveillance, and coastal defense. It is designed for effective detection of targets at low altitude in both ECM and natural clutter environments. The general designer of the JY-9 is academician of Chinese Academy of Sciences Mr. Wu Manqing (吴曼青, born 1965), the head of 38th Research Institute, who is also the general designer of the JY-8 Radar and of the radar systems for the KJ-2000 and KJ-200 early warning aircraft.

== System construction ==
The system consist of a radar/operations shelter, an antenna pallet, and a power station shelter. It is transportable by air, rail, and sea. The system can be set up or dismantled within 90 minutes, by a team of 8 men.

The JY-9 employs a dual-beam antenna assembly consisting of a deformed parabolic reflector, two horns and two feed channels. One channel is used for transmit, but both are used for receive. The antenna rotates at 6 or 12 rpm to provide all round coverage and can be mounted on a shelter or on the ground.

The JY-9 has high anti-jamming and anti-clutter capability due to the use of advanced techniques, including pulse to pulse frequency agility, dual channel, JATS, wide operating band, low sidelobes, MTD automatic spectrum processing, automatic clutter map and automatic residue map. The mean time between failures is better than 900 hours with Built-in test equipment (BITE).

The JY-9F three-dimensional low-altitude surveillance radar, is a new derivation of the JY-9 low-altitude radar. It is a fully coherent pulse-compression radar with a high reliability and mobility and can provide low-flying target information for national air defence information networks or for AAA or air traffic control systems.

The JY-9F consists of an antenna assembly, an operations shelter, a trailer-installed shelter housing two diesel generators and an optional trailer-installed shelter. The antenna can be folded down or erected by a motor-driven mechanism and the assembling and disassembling of the system can be accomplished by a crew of eight men within one hour. This advanced radar incorporates the state-of-the-art techniques. The excellent low sidelobe antenna employed in the system has greatly enhanced the radar's anti-clutter capability and ECCM performance, giving improved low-altitude detection performance. Three AMTI processing channels are used, each equipped to handle a particular environmental condition, thereby providing maximum low-altitude target detection. The wideband and highly stable TWT+CFA transmitter guarantees a super-clutter visibility in excess of 40 dB in the presence of ground clutter. The quadriphase Taylor code ensures a desirable consistency, high reliability and high stability. Meanwhile, the waveform agility can be realised. The JY-9F radar is characterised by high reliability and maintainability with an MTBF of more than 400 hours and MTTR of less than 30 minutes. Due to extensive BITE adopted in the system, troubleshooting probability reaches 95 per cent while 85 per cent of faults can be isolated to PCB level and all faults can be isolated to the replaceable unit level.

The system is manufactured by the East China Research Institute of Electronic Engineering(ECRIEE)/No.38 Research Institute.

== Specifications ==
- S band
- Antenna: Dual beam with super cosecant² pattern
- RPM: 6, 12 rpm
- Beamwidth: 15°, 18° (vertical)
- Power output: 200 kW (peak)
- Pulsewidth: 20 μs
- PRF: 790 Hz
- Coverage: 360° (azimuth), 0 - 40° (elevation)
- Altitude: 10 km
- Range: 150 km (Pd=80%; Swerling I; 2 m^{2})
- Detection accuracy: 80 m range; 0.3° azimuth
- Resolution: 120 – 140 m; azimuth 1.3°
- Track capacity: 200 plots, 72 tracks
