= JY-8 Radar =

JY-8
- Country of origin: People's Republic of China
- Introduced: unknown
- No. built: unknown
- Type: unknown
- Frequency: C band
- PRF: 36,500 Hz
- Beamwidth: 0.55° (horizontal), 0.9° (vertical)
- Pulsewidth: 3-3.3 μs
- RPM: 3/6 rpm
- Range: 350 km (max)
- Altitude: 25 km
- Diameter: unknown
- Azimuth: 360°
- Elevation: 20°
- Precision: 500m (range); 0.3°(azimuth); 600m (RMS) at 185 km range (height)
- Power: 800 kW x 2 (peak)

The JY-8 is a mobile 3D air surveillance, target acquisition and interception control radar system operating in the C-band. It can be employed as the main radar sensor for an automated tactical defence system, or can be used as an independent radar. The system uses advanced signal/data processor techniques and is fully solid state with the exception of the magnetrons and thyratrons of the transmitters. The general designer of JY-9 is the head of 38th Research Institute, academician of Chinese Academy of Sciences Mr. Wu Manqing (吴曼青, Aug 1965 -), who is also the general designer of JY-9 and the general designer of the radar systems for KJ-2000 and KJ-200.

== System construction ==
The system has four major components: the main antenna/transmitter/receiver shelter, operations shelter, maintenance shelter and tow truck. The complete system is air/sea transportable and can be assembled within one hour.

The system is designed to make use of amplitude comparison for height finding. With the aid of two computers, it is able to provide automatically accurate real-time 3D information on targets. Frequency diversity is used to increased detection probability. Other features include digital MTI, clutter map, automatic residue map and CFAR.

A multibeam antenna assembly, mounted on the transmitter/receiver shelter and rotating at 3/6 rpm, is employed to form a group of stacked beams. RF power is generated by two transmitters and is fed to a power dividing network and then illuminated to the reflector via a waveguide assembly and feed array, creating a group of individual beams stacked vertically to form a wide cosecant squared pattern. In reception, both individual and combined beams are employed, 11 beams are formed by a receive network connected with an 11 channel diversity receiver. The received signals are sequentially mixed, amplified, detected and finally sent for data processing.

The system is manufactured by the East China Research Institute of Electronic Engineering(ECRIEE)/No.38 Research Institute /华东电子工程研究所(中国电子科技集团公司第三十八研究所).

== Specifications ==
- C - Band
- Antenna beamwidth: 0.55° (horizontal), 0.9° (vertical)
- No. of receive beams: 11
- RPM: 3/6 rpm
- Power: 800 kW x 2 (peak)
- Pulse width: 3-3.3 μs
- PRF: 36,500 Hz
- Azimuth coverage: 360°
- Altitude coverage: 25 km
- Range: up to 350 km (max)
- Elevation: up to 20°
- Accuracy: 500m (range); 0.3° (azimuth); 600m (RMS) at 185 km range (height)
- Target resolution: 1000m (range); 0.6° (azimuth)
- Track capacity: 36 tracks
- Other reported names
  - Type 383 (unconfirmed service Type designation)
