= Cosecant squared antenna =

Type of parabolic reflector used in some radar systems

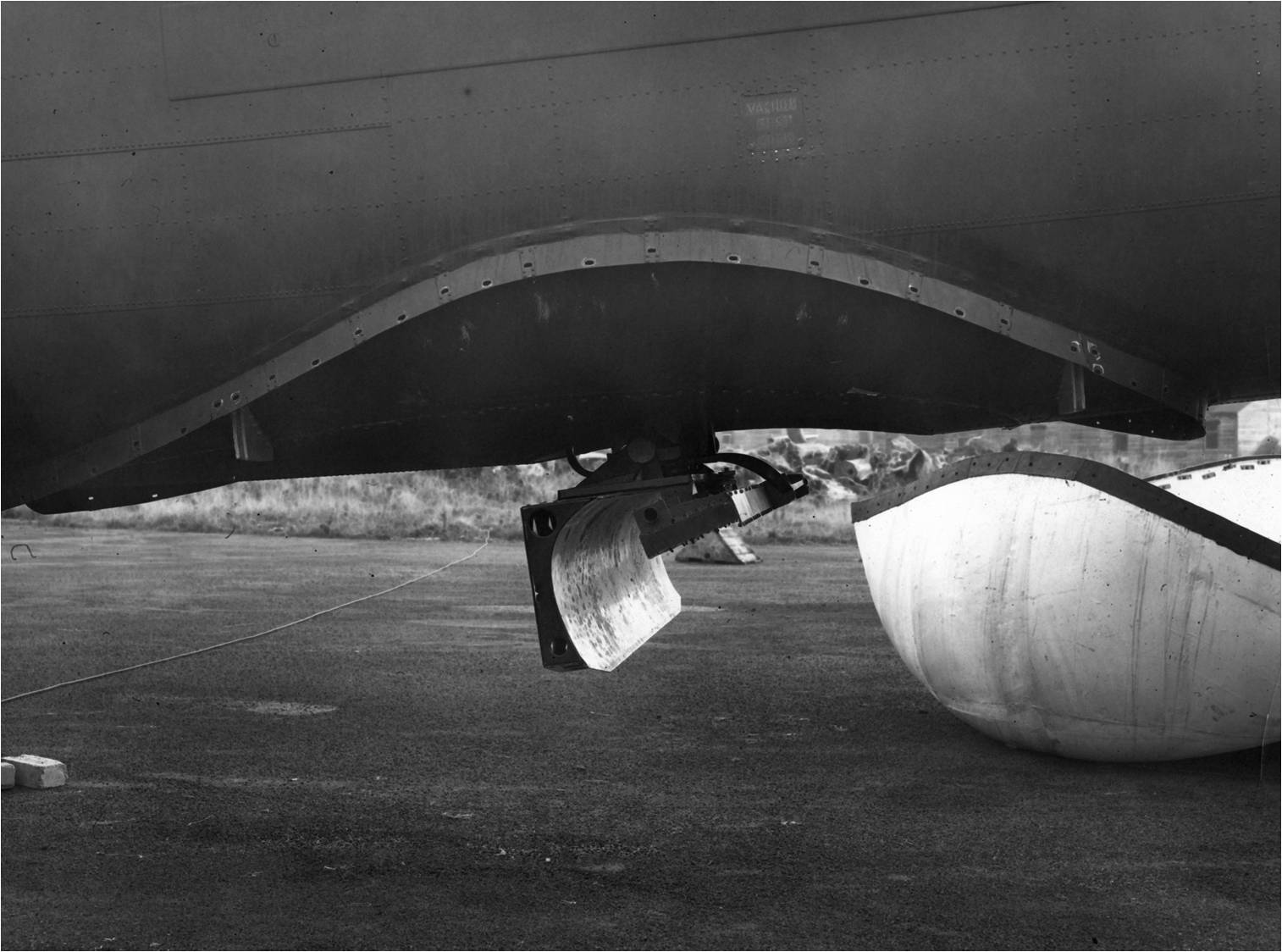
The antenna of this H2S radar shows the cosecant squared pattern in the increased curvature of the upper lip of the reflector plate.

A cosecant squared antenna, sometimes known as a constant height pattern, is a modified form of parabolic reflector used in some radar systems. It is shaped to send more radio energy in certain directions in order to smooth out the reception pattern of objects as their range changes in relation to the radar. The name refers to the fact that the amount of energy returned from a target drops off with the square of the cosecant of the angle between the radar and the target.

== Development ==
The concept originated as part of the development of the H2S radar, which scanned the area under an aircraft to provide a radar map of the ground below. The ground directly below the aircraft is at a distance equal to the aircraft's altitude and produces the strongest signal. The terrain return at further distances is much a weaker signal due to the radar equation.

The slant range distance between the radar and the terrain is the cosecant of the angle between the fuselage and the target, and the energy falls off with the fourth root of that number. Without correction, this produced a display where the ground under the aircraft was very bright on the cathode ray tube display, while the terrain at longer distances was almost invisible.

To counteract this, the scanning antenna was re-aimed so that it was pointed almost directly forward, thereby sending most of the radar energy at low angles relative to the aircraft, thereby increasing the energy available at long range. This left the area directly under the aircraft receiving no energy at all, so the upper lip of the reflector was bent to reflect a small amount of energy in that direction. This results in a more even display pattern.

The same basic concept soon found many roles. For ground-based radars, the same modification could be used to provide scanning at high angles above the station while still sending most of the energy towards low angles to detect aircraft at long range as they rose above the radar horizon.

The opposite modification could also be used, bending the upper lip outward, with the same basic outcome.

== Derivation ==
An object at height h above the ground and slant range R forms an angle α that can be calculated through sin α = h / R. By re-arrangement, R = h / sin α, or R = h csc α.

The radar equation states that the signal received from an object, P_{e}, varies inversely with the 4th power of range and directly as the square of the antenna gain, G, such that P_{e} ~ G^{2} / R^{4}. If the goal is to produce a constant P_{e}, then G^{2} ~ R^{4}, or G ~ R^{2}.

Substituting in our formula for R gives G ~ (h csc α)^{2}. Since the constant signal is desired for objects at a constant h, say the altitude of the ground scanning aircraft, or a ground radar watching an aircraft at constant altitude, then we can eliminate h as well, leaving G ~ csc^{2} α, the cosecant squared relationship.
