= Scalloping =

Scalloping may refer to:

== Activities related to the sea creature ==
- Scallop fishing
- Scallop gathering

== Other uses ==
- Scalloping (cave feature), a dissolutional feature on the wall of a cave
- Scalloping (fingerboard), shaping of fingerboards of stringed instruments
- Scalloping, gratin preparation, a casserole cooking technique
- Radar scalloping, a radar phenomenon that reduces sensitivity for certain distance and velocity combinations
- Scalloping loss, loss associated with spectral leakage from windowing in a discrete Fourier transform
- An arrangement of plates in a steel dam, to allow expansion and contraction

== See also ==
- Scaloppine or scaloppini, an Italian dish
