= Ambiguity resolution =

Radar signal processing

Ambiguity resolution is used to find the value of a measurement that requires modulo sampling.

This is required for pulse-Doppler radar signal processing.

== Measurements ==
Some types of measurements introduce an unavoidable modulo operation in the measurement process. This happens with all radar systems.

Radar aliasing happens when:

- Pulse repetition frequency (PRF) is too low to sample Doppler frequency directly
- PRF is too high to sample range directly

Pulse Doppler sonar uses similar principles to measure position and velocity involving liquids.

=== Radar Systems ===
Radar systems operating at a PRF below about 3 kHz pulse rate produce true range, but produce ambiguous target speed. Radar systems operating at a PRF above 30 kHz produce true target speed, but produce ambiguous target range.

Medium PRF systems produce both ambiguous range measurement and ambiguous radial speed measurement using PRF from 3 kHz to 30 kHz.

Ambiguity resolution finds true range and true speed by using ambiguous range and ambiguous speed measurements with multiple PRF.

=== Doppler Measurements ===
Doppler systems involve velocity measurements similar to the kind of measurements made using a strobe light.

For example, a strobe light can be used as a tachometer to measure rotational velocity for rotating machinery. Strobe light measurements can be inaccurate because the light may be flashing 2 or 3 times faster than shaft rotation speed. The user can only produce an accurate measurement by increasing the pulse rate starting near zero until pulses are fast enough to make the rotating object appear stationary.

Radar and sonar systems use the same phenomenon to detect target speed.

== Operation ==
The ambiguity region is shown graphically in this image. The x axis is range (left-right). The y axis is radial speed. The z axis is amplitude (up-down). The shape of the rectangles changes when the PRF changes.

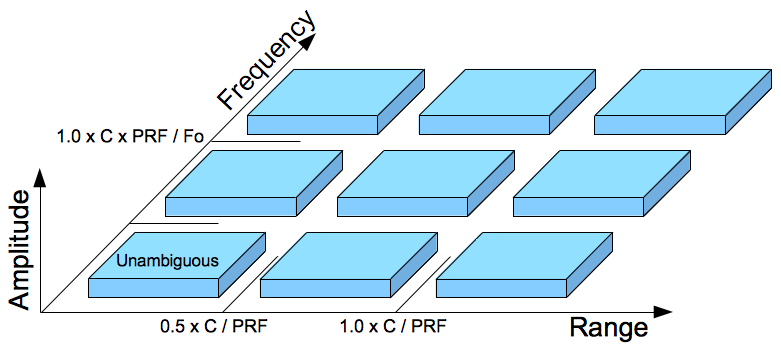
Pulse-Doppler ambiguity zones. Each blue zone with no label represents a velocity/range combination that will be folded into the unambiguous zone. Areas outside the blue zones are blind ranges and blind velocities, which are filled in using multiple PRF and frequency agility.

The unambiguous zone is in the lower left corner. All of the other blocks have ambiguous range or ambiguous radial velocity.

Pulse Doppler radar relies on medium pulse repetition frequency (PRF) from about 3 kHz to 30 kHz. Each transmit pulse is separated by between 5 km and 50 km of distance.

=== Range Ambiguity Resolution ===
The received signals from multiple PRF are compared using the range ambiguity resolution process.

Each range sample is converted from time domain I/Q samples into frequency domain. Older systems use individual filters for frequency filtering. Newer systems use digital sampling and a Fast Fourier transform or Discrete Fourier transform instead of physical filters. Each filter converts time samples into a frequency spectrum. Each spectrum frequency corresponds with a different speed. These samples are thresholded to obtain ambiguous range for several different PRF.

=== Frequency Ambiguity Resolution ===
The received signals are also compared using the frequency ambiguity resolution process.

A blind velocity occurs when Doppler frequency falls close to the PRF. This folds the return signal into the same filter as stationary clutter reflections. Rapidly alternating different PRF while scanning eliminates blind frequencies.
