= Feed-through null =

In radar engineering, feed-through null follows the duplexer and is commonly used with continuous-wave radar to improve performance.

== Definition ==
The transmitter is constantly issuing high power RF with continuous wave radar. Some of the transmit signal will leak into the receiver when the receive antenna is near the transmit antenna.

The signal that leaks from the transmitter to the receiver is called bleed-through. Electronic circuits have limited dynamic range, and this reduces receiver sensitivity.

Feed-through nulling significantly reduces the bleed-through signal, which can be used to increase receiver sensitivity in continuous wave radar.

== Operation ==
There are two kinds of feed-through nuller.

- Active
- Passive

=== Active ===
A sample of the transmit signal is fed to an attenuator.

The feed-through nuller samples the bleed-through signal arriving at the receiver. This bleed-through sample is amplified, filtered (low-pass), and this is used to drive the attenuator.

Attenuator output is phase shifted 180 degrees added to the receive signal. This cancels the bleed-through signal.

Total gain determines the amount of cancellation.

=== Passive ===
A passive feed-through nuller uses a band-stop filter to reduce low-frequency signals before digital signal sampling, and this includes the bleed-through signal.

The band-pass filter used with a microwave receiver is typically 1 MHz. The band-stop filter used as a feed-through nuller is typically 1kHz, which attenuates signals in the center of the band-pass filter.

The band-stop filter is generally wide enough to reduce clutter, in addition to the bleed-through signal.

Passive feed-through nulling is not used with CW radar altimeters because this eliminates the ground-bounce signal.
