= Terrain return =

Signal returned from the ground surface

The terrain return is the signal returned from the ground surface when sensed by various remote sensing systems, e.g., radars.

One may distinguish two components of terrain return: the wanted signal (e.g., when generating a radar map of the terrain or when used for terrain avoidance and collision detection) and ground clutter, an unwanted signal that interferes with sensing of various objects other than terrain.

The ground-to-air terrain return at vertical or near-vertical incidence angles may be decomposed into two components: a mirror-like specular component and the scatter component produced by reradiation from the individual scatterers in the terrain (large isolated scatterers and area scatter).

The image record of the radar terrain return depends on the frequency, angle of incidence, and polarization of the signal. This dependence varies with the nature of the terrain surface; for example, if the terrain is covered by vegetation, a 35GHz K band signal will record vegetation, while a 0.4GHz P band signal will penetrate vegetation and record a combination of vegetation and soil surface.

== See also ==
- Terrain-following radar
- Digital elevation model
