= Range ambiguity resolution =

Radar technique

Range ambiguity resolution is a technique used with medium pulse-repetition frequency (PRF) radar to obtain range information for distances that exceed the distance between transmit pulses.

This signal processing technique is required with pulse-Doppler radar.

The raw return signal from a reflection will appear to be arriving from a distance less than the true range of the reflection when the wavelength of the pulse repetition frequency (PRF) is less than the range of the reflection. This causes reflected signals to be folded, so that the apparent range is a modulo function of true range.

== Definition ==
Range aliasing occurs when reflections arrive from distances that exceed the distance between transmit pulses at a specific pulse repetition frequency (PRF).

Range ambiguity resolution is required to obtain the true range when the measurements are made using a system where the following inequality is true.

$$\text{Distance} > \left (\frac {c}{2 \times \mathrm{PRF}} \right)$$

Here c is the signal speed, which for radar is the speed of light. The range measurements made in this way produces a modulo function of the true range.

$$\text{Apparent Range} = (\text{True Range}) \mod \left (\frac {c}{2 \times \mathrm{PRF}} \right)$$

=== Theory ===
To find the true range, the radar must measure the apparent range using two or more different PRF.

Suppose a two PRF combination is chosen where the distance between transmit pulses (pulse spacing) is different by the pulse width of the transmitter.

$$Two \ PRF \ Combination \begin{cases} Pulse \ Spacing \ (Ambiguous \ Range) = \frac{1}{\mathrm{PRF}} \\  \\ \frac{1}{\mathrm{PRF}_A} - \frac{1}{\mathrm{PRF}_B} = \pm \ Transmit \ Pulse \ Width \end{cases}$$

Each transmit pulse is separated in distance the ambiguous range interval. Multiple samples are taken between transmit pulses.

If the receive signal falls in the same sample number for both PRF, then the object is in the first ambiguous range interval. If the receive signal falls into sample numbers that are different by one, then the object is in the second ambiguous range interval. If the receive signal falls into sample numbers that are different by two, then the object is in the third ambiguous range interval.

The general constraints for range performance are as follows.

Each sample is processed to determine if there is a reflected signal (detection). This is called signal detection.

The detection made using both PRF can be compared to identify the true range. This comparison depends upon the transmitter duty cycle (the ratio between on and off).

The duty cycle is the ratio of the width of the transmit pulse width $\Tau$ and the period between pulses $1/\mathrm{PRF}$.

$$\begin{align} Transmitter \\ Characteristics \end{align} \begin{cases} Duty \ Cycle = \mathrm{PRF} \times Transmit \ Pulse \ Width \\  \\ Pulse \ Spacing = \left( \frac {c}{\mathrm{PRF}} \right)\end{cases}$$

Pulse-Doppler can reliably resolve true range at all distances less than the Instrumented Range. The optimum pair of PRF used for a pulse-Doppler detection scheme must be different by a minimum of $\mathrm{PRF} * \text{Duty Cycle}$. This makes the range of each PRF different by the width of the sample period.

The difference between the sample numbers where reflection signal is found for these two PRF will be about the same as the number of the ambiguous range intervals between the radar and the reflector (i.e.: if the reflection falls in sample 3 for PRF 1 and in sample 5 for PRF 2, then the reflector is in ambiguous range interval 2=5-3).

$$\begin{align}Instrumented \\ Range \end{align} \begin{cases} Minimum \ Sample \ Width = \left( \frac{Duty \ Cycle}{\mathrm{PRF}} \right) \\  \\ Maximum \ Distance = \left( \frac{Pulse \ Spacing}{Sample \ Width}\right) = \left( \frac{c}{Sample \ Width \times 2 \times \mathrm{PRF}^2}\right) \\   \\ Samples \ Per \ Transmit \ Pulse = \left( \frac{1}{Minimum \ Sample \ Width} - 1 \right) \end{cases}$$

There is no guarantee that true range will be found for objects beyond this distance.

=== Operation ===
The following is a special case of the Chinese remainder theorem.

Each ambiguous range sample contains the receive signal from multiple different range locations. Ambiguity processing determines the true range.

This is explained best using the following example, where PRF A produces a transmit pulse every 6 km and PRF B produces a transmit pulse every 5 km.

Transmit	1 km Sample	2 km Sample	3 km Sample	4 km Sample	5 km Sample
		Target PRF A			
				Target PRF B	

The apparent range for PRF A falls in the 2 km sample, and the apparent range for PRF B falls in the 4 km sample. This combination places the true target distance at 14 km (2x6+2 or 2x5+4). This can be seen graphically when range intervals are stacked end-to-end as shown below.

0	1	2	3	4	5	6	7	8	9	10	11	12	13	14	15	16	17	18	19	20	21	22	23	24	25	26	27	29	29
		A						A						A						A						A			
				B					B					B					B					B					B

"A" represents target range possibilities for PRF A, and "B" represents target range possibilities for PRF B.

This process uses a look-up table when there is only one detection. The size of the table limits the maximum range.

The process shown above is a type of digital convolution algorithm.

== Limitations ==
This technique has two limitations.

- Blind Zones
- Multiple Targets

The process described above is slightly more complex in real systems because more than one detection signal can occur within the radar beam. The pulse rate must alternate rapidly between at least 4 different PRF to handle these complexities.

=== Blind Zones ===
Each individual PRF has blind ranges, where the transmitter pulse occurs at the same time as the target reflection signal arrives back at the radar. Each individual PRF has blind velocities where the velocity of the aircraft will appear stationary. This causes scalloping, where the radar can be blind for some combinations of speed and distance.

- Radar scalloping detailed explanation

A four PRF scheme is generally used with two pair of PRF for the detection process so that blind zones are eliminated.

The antenna must dwell in the same position for at least three different PRF. This imposes a minimum time limit for the volume to be scanned.

=== Multiple Targets ===
Multiple aircraft within the radar beam that are separated by over 500 meters introduces additional degrees of freedom that requires additional information and additional processing. This is mathematically equivalent to multiple unknown quantities that require multiple equations. Algorithms that handle multiple targets often employ some type of clustering to determine how many targets are present.

Doppler frequency shift induced by changing transmit frequency reduces unknown degrees of freedom.

Sorting detections in order of amplitude reduces unknown degrees of freedom.

Ambiguity resolution relies on processing detections with similar size or speed together as a group.

== Implementations ==
- MATLAB: The disambigCRT1D and disambiguateClust1D functions that are part of the United States Naval Research Laboratory's free and open-source software Tracker Component Library on GitHub can be used for range disambiguation in the presence of multiple targets and false alarms.
