= Radar scalloping =

Radar phenomenon

Scalloping is a radar phenomenon that reduces sensitivity for certain distance and velocity combinations.

The name is derived from the appearance of areas that are scooped out of graphs that indicate radar sensitivity.

Moving objects cause a phase-shift within the transmit pulse that produces signal cancellation. This phenomenon also has detrimental effects on moving target indicator systems, where the detection scheme subtracts signals received from two or more transmit pulses.

== Definition ==
There are two different types of radar scalloping.

- Intra-pulse
- Inter-pulse

=== Intra-pulse Scalloping ===
This occurs when the radial velocity of the target induces a phase shift near 360 degrees within the reflected pulse, which induces signal cancellation in the receiver.

Intra-pulse radar scalloping begins to become a concern above the following velocity.

$$Velocity > \left (\frac {C}{2 \times Transmit Frequency \times Pulse Width} \right)$$

Scalloping occurs at 150 km/s for an L-band radar with a 1 microsecond pulse.

=== Inter-pulse Scalloping ===
Inter-pulse radar scalloping involves two types of systems.

- Moving Target Indicator
- Pulse-Doppler Radar

==== Moving Target Indicator ====
Scalloping occurs when the radial velocity of the reflector induces an odd integer multiple of a 360 degree phase shift between two or more transmit pulses.

Radar scalloping for MTI radar begins to become a concern when the radial velocity is greater than the following value.

$$Velocity >  0.5 \times \left (\frac {C}{2 \times Period Between Pulses \times Transmit Frequency} \right)$$

This occurs near multiples of 15 m/s for an L-Band radar with pulse repetition frequency of 1kHz (10m/s to 20m/s, 25m/s to 35m/s, 40m/s to 50m/s, and so on).

==== Pulse-Doppler Radar ====
Scalloping for pulse-Doppler radar involves blind velocities created by the clutter rejection filter. A two PRF detection schemes will have detection gaps with a pattern of discrete ranges, each of which has a blind velocity.

Scalloping happens in a two PRF detection scenario when target velocity produces a blind velocity for one PRF while the target is at the blind range of the other PRF.

The blind velocity for a specific pulse repetition frequency (PRF) is an integer multiple of the following, which causes the signal to have zero doppler.

$$Blind \ Velocity = \left (\frac {C \times PRF}{2 \times Transmit \ Frequency} \right)$$

The blind range for a specific PRF is an integer multiple of the distance between transmit pulses, which is when the reflected pulse arrives at the same time as when the transmitter fires.

$$Blind \ Range = \left (\frac {C}{2 \times PRF} \right)$$

This leaves a series of detection gaps at discrete velocity and range combinations.

These detection gaps are filled in by using three or more alternating PRF in the detection scheme.

An L-Band transmitter using a 3 kHz and 4 kHz PRF pair has the following characteristics.

- 3 kHz blind ranges are 50 km, 100 km, ...
- 3 kHz blind velocities are 450 km/s, 900 km/s, ...
- 4 kHz blind ranges are 37.5 km, 75 km, ...
- 4 kHz blind velocities are 600 km/s, 1,200 km/s, ...

This system would fail to detect reflections at 50 km and 100 km that are moving 600 km/s or 1,200 km/s.

It would also fail to detect reflections at 37.5 km and 75 km that are moving 450 km/s or 900 km/s.

== Compensation Strategies ==
Intra-pulse scalloping is improved by shortening the transmit pulse or by modulating the transmit pulse. This can include frequency or phase shifting associated with pulse compression.

Moving target indicator (MTI) radar reduces the impact of blind velocity by using redundant detectors that introduce a compensating reverse phase shift undoes the phase shift caused by Doppler from reflector motion. This is also improved by using 3 or more pulses with staggering pulse intervals.

Pulse-Doppler radar systems compensate using 3 or more different pulse repetition frequency in the detection scheme.
