= Dwell time (radar) =

Dwell time (T_{D}) in surveillance radar is the time that an antenna beam spends on a target. The dwell time of a 2D–search radar depends predominantly on

- the antenna's horizontal beam width θ_{AZ}, and
- the turn speed n of the antenna (in rotations per minute or rpm, i.e. 360 degrees in 60 seconds = multiplied by a factor of 6).

Dwell time is calculated by:

$$T_D = \frac{\theta_{AZ}}{6 \cdot n} \quad\quad \text{(in seconds)}$$

A block of constant PRF and coherently phased RF pulses, is referred to as a coherent dwell interval or coherent dwell time.
