= Pulse-repetition frequency =

Number of pulses of a repeating signal

The pulse-repetition frequency (PRF) is the number of pulses of a repeating signal in a specific time unit. The term is used within a number of technical disciplines, notably radar.

In radar, a radio signal of a particular carrier frequency is turned on and off; the term "frequency" refers to the carrier, while the PRF refers to the number of switches. Both are measured in terms of cycle per second, or hertz. The PRF is normally much lower than the frequency. For instance, a typical World War II radar like the Type 7 GCI radar had a basic carrier frequency of 209 MHz (209 million cycles per second) and a PRF of 300 or 500 pulses per second. A related measure is the pulse width, the amount of time the transmitter is turned on during each pulse.

After producing a brief pulse of radio signal, the transmitter is turned off in order for the receiver units to detect the reflections of that signal off distant targets. Since the radio signal has to travel out to the target and back again, the required inter-pulse quiet period is a function of the radar's desired range. Longer periods are required for longer range signals, requiring lower PRFs. Conversely, higher PRFs produce shorter maximum ranges, but broadcast more pulses, and thus radio energy, in a given time. This creates stronger reflections that make detection easier. Radar systems must balance these two competing requirements.

Using older electronics, PRFs were generally fixed to a specific value, or might be switched among a limited set of possible values. This gives each radar system a characteristic PRF, which can be used in electronic warfare to identify the type or class of a particular platform such as a ship or aircraft, or in some cases, a particular unit. Radar warning receivers in aircraft include a library of common PRFs which can identify not only the type of radar, but in some cases the mode of operation. This allowed pilots to be warned when an SA-2 SAM battery had "locked on", for instance. Modern radar systems are generally able to smoothly change their PRF, pulse width and carrier frequency, making identification much more difficult.

Sonar and lidar systems also have PRFs, as does any pulsed system. In the case of sonar, the term pulse-repetition rate (PRR) is more common, although it refers to the same concept.

== Introduction ==
Electromagnetic (e.g. radio or light) waves are conceptually pure single frequency phenomena while pulses may be mathematically thought of as composed of a number of pure frequencies that sum and nullify in interactions that create a pulse train of the specific amplitudes, PRRs, base frequencies, phase characteristics, et cetera (See Fourier Analysis). The first term (PRF) is more common in device technical literature (Electrical Engineering and some sciences), and the latter (PRR) more commonly used in military-aerospace terminology (especially United States armed forces terminologies) and equipment specifications such as training and technical manuals for radar and sonar systems.

The reciprocal of PRF (or PRR) is called the pulse-repetition time (PRT), pulse-repetition interval (PRI), or inter-pulse period (IPP), which is the elapsed time from the beginning of one pulse to the beginning of the next pulse. The IPP term is normally used when referring to the quantity of PRT periods to be processed digitally. Each PRT having a fixed number of range gates, but not all of them being used. For example, the APY-1 radar used 128 IPP's with a fixed 50 range gates, producing 128 Doppler filters using an FFT. The different number of range gates on each of the five PRF's all being less than 50.

Within radar technology PRF is important since it determines the maximum target range (R_{max}) and maximum Doppler velocity (V_{max}) that can be accurately determined by the radar. Conversely, a high PRR/PRF can enhance target discrimination of nearer objects, such as a periscope or fast moving missile. This leads to use of low PRRs for search radar, and very high PRFs for fire control radars. Many dual-purpose and navigation radars—especially naval designs with variable PRRs—allow a skilled operator to adjust PRR to enhance and clarify the radar picture—for example in bad sea states where wave action generates false returns, and in general for less clutter, or perhaps a better return signal off a prominent landscape feature (e.g., a cliff).

== Definition ==
Pulse-repetition frequency (PRF) is the number of times a pulsed activity occurs every second.

This is similar to cycle per second used to describe other types of waveforms.

PRF is inversely proportional to time period $\Tau$ which is the property of a pulsed wave.

$$\Tau = \frac{1}{\text{PRF}}$$

PRF is usually associated with pulse spacing, which is the distance that the pulse travels before the next pulse occurs.

$$\text{Pulse Spacing} = \frac{\text{Propagation Speed}}{\text{PRF}}$$

== Physics ==
PRF is crucial to perform measurements for certain physics phenomenon.

For example, a tachometer may use a strobe light with an adjustable PRF to measure rotational velocity. The PRF for the strobe light is adjusted upward from a low value until the rotating object appears to stand still. The PRF of the tachometer would then match the speed of the rotating object.

Other types of measurements involve distance using the delay time for reflected echo pulses from light, microwaves, and sound transmissions.

== Measurement ==
PRF is crucial for systems and devices that measure distance.

- Radar
- Laser range finder
- Sonar

Different PRF allow systems to perform very different functions.

A radar system uses a radio frequency electromagnetic signal reflected from a target to determine information about that target.

PRF is required for radar operation. This is the rate at which transmitter pulses are sent into air or space.

=== Range ambiguity ===
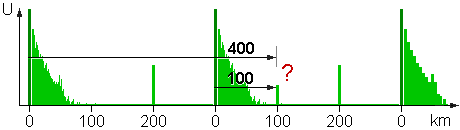
The highlighted return could either represent a real target at 100 km, or a second-sweep echo at a distance of 400 km

A radar system determines range through the time delay between pulse transmission and reception by the relation:

$$\text{Range} = \frac{c\tau}{2}$$

For accurate range determination a pulse must be transmitted and reflected before the next pulse is transmitted. This gives rise to the maximum unambiguous range limit:

$$\text{Max Range} = \frac{c\tau_\text{PRT}}{2} = \frac{c}{2\,\text{PRF}} \qquad \begin{cases} \tau_\text{PRT} = \frac{1}{\text{PRF}} \end{cases}$$

The maximum range also defines a range ambiguity for all detected targets. Because of the periodic nature of pulsed radar systems, it is impossible for some radar system to determine the difference between targets separated by integer multiples of the maximum range using a single PRF. More sophisticated radar systems avoid this problem through the use of multiple PRFs either simultaneously on different frequencies or on a single frequency with a changing PRT.

The range ambiguity resolution process is used to identify true range when PRF is above this limit.

=== Low PRF ===
Systems using PRF below 3 kHz are considered low PRF because direct range can be measured to a distance of at least 50 km. Radar systems using low PRF typically produce unambiguous range.

Unambiguous Doppler processing becomes an increasing challenge due to coherency limitations as PRF falls below 3 kHz.

For example, an L-Band radar with 500 Hz pulse rate produces ambiguous velocity above 75 m/s (170 mile/hour), while detecting true range up to 300 km. This combination is appropriate for civilian aircraft radar and weather radar.

$$\text{300 km range} = \frac{C}{2 \times 500}$$

$$\text{75 m/s velocity} = \frac{500 \times C}{2 \times 10^9}$$

Low PRF radar have reduced sensitivity in the presence of low-velocity clutter that interfere with aircraft detection near terrain. Moving target indicator is generally required for acceptable performance near terrain, but this introduces radar scalloping issues that complicate the receiver. Low PRF radar intended for aircraft and spacecraft detection are heavily degraded by weather phenomenon, which cannot be compensated using moving target indicator.

=== Medium PRF ===
Range and velocity can both be identified using medium PRF, but neither one can be identified directly. Medium PRF is from 3 kHz to 30 kHz, which corresponds with radar range from 5 km to 50 km. This is the ambiguous range, which is much smaller than the maximum range. Range ambiguity resolution is used to determine true range in medium PRF radar.

Medium PRF is used with Pulse-Doppler radar, which is required for look-down/shoot-down capability in military systems. Doppler radar return is generally not ambiguous until velocity exceeds the speed of sound.

A technique called ambiguity resolution is required to identify true range and speed. Doppler signals fall between 1.5 kHz, and 15 kHz, which is audible, so audio signals from medium-PRF radar systems can be used for passive target classification.

For example, an L band radar system using a PRF of 10 kHz with a duty cycle of 3.3% can identify true range to a distance of 450 km (30 * C / 10,000 km/s). This is the instrumented range. Unambiguous velocity is 1,500 m/s (3,300 mile/hour).

$$\text{450 km} = \frac{C}{0.033 \times 2 \times 10,000}$$
$$\text{1,500 m/s} = \frac{10,000 \times C}{2 \times 10^9}$$

The unambiguous velocity of an L-Band radar using a PRF of 10 kHz would be 1,500 m/s (3,300 mile/hour) (10,000 x C / (2 x 10^9)). True velocity can be found for objects moving under 45,000 m/s if the band pass filter admits the signal (1,500/0.033).

Medium PRF has unique radar scalloping issues that require redundant detection schemes.

=== High PRF ===
Systems using PRF above 30 kHz function better known as interrupted continuous-wave (ICW) radar because direct velocity can be measured up to 4.5 km/s at L band, but range resolution becomes more difficult.

High PRF is limited to systems that require close-in performance, like proximity fuses and law enforcement radar.

For example, if 30 samples are taken during the quiescent phase between transmit pulses using a 30 kHz PRF, then true range can be determined to a maximum of 150 km using 1 microsecond samples (30 x C / 30,000 km/s). Reflectors beyond this range might be detectable, but the true range cannot be identified.

$$\text{150 km} = \frac{30 \times C}{2 \times 30,000}$$
$$\text{4,500 m/s} = \frac{30,000 \times C}{2 \times 10^9}$$

It becomes increasingly difficult to take multiple samples between transmit pulses at these pulse frequencies, so range measurements are limited to short distances.

=== Sonar ===
Sonar systems operate much like radar, except that the medium is liquid or air, and the frequency of the signal is either audio or ultra-sonic. Like radar, lower frequencies propagate relatively higher energies longer distances with less resolving ability. Higher frequencies, which damp out faster, provide increased resolution of nearby objects.

Signals propagate at the speed of sound in the medium (almost always water), and maximum PRF depends upon the size of the object being examined. For example, the speed of sound in water is 1,497 m/s, and the human body is about 0.5 m thick, so the PRF for ultrasound images of the human body should be less than about 2 kHz (1,497/0.5).

As another example, ocean depth is approximately 2 km, so sound takes over a second to return from the sea floor. Sonar is a very slow technology with very low PRF for this reason.

=== Laser ===
Light waves can be used as radar frequencies, in which case the system is known as lidar. This is short for "LIght Detection And Ranging," similar to the original meaning of the initialism "RADAR," which was RAdio Detection And Ranging. Both have since become commonly used english words, and are therefore acronyms rather than initialisms.

Laser range or other light signal frequency range finders operate just like radar at much higher frequencies. Non-laser light detection is utilized extensively in automated machine control systems (e.g. electric eyes controlling a garage door, conveyor sorting gates, etc.), and those that use pulse-rate detection and ranging are, at heart, the same type of system as a radar—without the bells and whistles of the human interface.

Unlike lower radio signal frequencies, light does not bend around the curve of the earth or reflect off the ionosphere like C-band search radar signals, and so lidar is useful only in line-of-sight applications like higher-frequency radar systems.

== See also ==
- Radar
- Pulse-Doppler radar
- Weather radar
