= Wave radar =

Technology for measuring surface waves on water

Measuring ocean waves by use of marine radars.

Wave radar is a type of radar for measuring wind waves. Several instruments based on a variety of different concepts and techniques are available, and these are all often called. This article (see also Grønlie 2004), gives a brief description of the most common ground-based radar remote sensing techniques.

Instruments based on radar remote sensing techniques have become of particular interest in applications where it is important to avoid direct contact with the water surface and avoid structural interference. A typical case is wave measurements from an offshore platform in deep water, where swift currents could make mooring a wave buoy enormously difficult. Another interesting case is a ship under way, where having instruments in the sea is highly impractical and interference from the ship's hull must be avoided.

== Radar remote sensing ==
=== Terms and definitions ===
Basically there are two different classes of radar remote sensors for ocean waves.

- Direct sensor measures directly some relevant parameter of the wave system (like surface elevation or water particle velocity).
- Indirect sensors observe the surface waves via the interaction with some other physical process as for example the radar cross section of the sea surface.

Microwave radars may be used in two different modes;

- The near vertical mode. The radar echo is generated by specular reflections from the sea surface.
- The low grazing angle mode. The radar echo is generated by Bragg scattering, hence wind generated surface ripple (capillary waves) must be present. The backscattered signal will be modulated by the large surface gravity waves and the gravity wave information is derived from the modulation of the backscattered signal. An excellent presentation of the theories of microwave remote sensing of the sea surface is given by Plant and Shuler (1980).

The radar footprint (the size of the surface area which is illuminated by the radar) must be small in comparison with all ocean wavelengths of interest. The radar spatial resolution is determined by the bandwidth of the radar signal (see radar signal characteristics) and the beamwidth of the radar antenna.

The beam of a microwave antenna diverges. Consequently, the resolution decreases with increasing range. For all practical purposes, the beam of an IR radar (laser) does not diverge. Therefore, its resolution is independent of range.

HF radars utilize the Bragg scattering mechanism and do always operate at very low grazing angles. Due to the low frequency of operation the radar waves are backscattered directly from the gravity waves and surface ripple need not be present.

Radar transceivers may be coherent or non-coherent. Coherent radars measure Doppler-modulation as well as amplitude modulation, while non-coherent radars only measure amplitude modulation. Consequently, a non-coherent radar echo contains less information about the sea surface properties. Examples of non-coherent radars are conventional marine navigation radars.

Energy backscattered from sea surface as a function of angle.

The radar transmitter waveform may be either unmodulated continuous wave, modulated or pulsed. An unmodulated continuous wave radar has no range resolution, but can resolve targets on the basis of different velocity, while a modulated or pulsed radar can resolve echoes from different ranges. The radar waveform plays a very important role in radar theory (Plant and Shuler, 1980).

=== Factors influencing performance ===
- Mode of operation or measurement geometry (vertical or grazing)
- Class of system (direct or indirect)
- Frequency of operation
- Radar waveform (unmodulated CW or modulated/pulsed)
- Type of transceiver (coherent or non-coherent)
- Radar antenna properties

== Remote sensing techniques ==
An excellent survey of different radar techniques for remote sensing of waves is given by Tucker (1991).

=== Microwave rangefinders ===
Microwave rangefinders also operate in vertical mode at GHz frequencies and are not as affected by fog and water spray as the laser rangefinder. A continuous wave frequency modulated (CWFM) or pulsed radar waveform is normally used to provide range resolution. Since the beam diverges, the linear size of the footprint is directly proportional to range, while the area of the footprint is proportional to the square of range.

One example of a microwave range finder is the Miros SM-094, which is designed to measure waves and water level, including tides. This sensor is used as an air gap (bridge clearance) sensor in NOAA's PORTS system. Another example is the WaveRadar REX, which is a derivative of a Rosemount tank radar.

Digitized sea clutter image.

From data on the elevation of the surface of the water at three or more locations, a directional spectrum of wave height can be computed. The algorithm is similar to the one which generates a directional spectrum from data on heave (vertical motion), pitch and roll at a single location, as provided by a disc-shaped wave buoy. An array of three vertical radars, having footprints at the vertices of a horizontal, equilateral triangle, can provide the necessary data on water surface elevation. “Directional WaveGuide” is a commercial radar system based on this technique. It is available from the Dutch companies Enraf and Radac.

=== Marine navigation radars ===
Marine navigation radars (X band) provide sea clutter images which contain a pattern resembling a sea wave pattern. By digitizing the radar video signal it can be processed by a digital computer. Sea surface parameters may be calculated on the basis of these digitized images. The marine navigation radar operates in low grazing angle mode and wind generated surface ripple must be present. The marine navigation radar is non-coherent and is a typical example of an indirect wave sensor, because there is no direct relation between wave height and radar back-scatter modulation amplitude. An empirical method of wave spectrum scaling is normally employed. Marine navigation radar based wave sensors are excellent tools for wave direction measurements. A marine navigation radar may also be a tool for surface current measurements. Point measurements of the current vector as well as current maps up to a distance of a few km can be provided (Gangeskar, 2002). Miros WAVEX has its main area of application as directional wave measurements from moving ships. Another example of a marine radar based system is OceanWaves WaMoS II.

Measurement geometry of pulsed Doppler wave and current radar.

=== The range gated pulsed Doppler microwave radar ===
The range gated pulsed Doppler microwave radar operates in low grazing angle mode. By using several antennas it may be used as a directional wave sensor, basically measuring the directional spectrum of the horizontal water particle velocity. The velocity spectrum is directly related to the wave height spectrum by a mathematical model based on linear wave theory and accurate measurements of the wave spectrum can be provided under most conditions. As measurements are taken at a distance from the platform on which it is mounted, the wave field is to a small degree disturbed by interference from the platform structure.

Miros Wave and current radar is the only available wave sensor based on the range gated pulsed Doppler radar technique. This radar also uses the dual frequency technique (see below) to perform point measurements of the surface current vector

=== The dual frequency microwave radar ===
The dual frequency microwave radar transmits two microwave frequencies simultaneously. The frequency separation is chosen to give a “spatial beat” length which is in the range of the water waves of interest. The dual frequency radar may be considered a microwave equivalent of the high frequency (HF) radar (see below). The dual frequency radar is suitable for the measurement of surface current. As far as wave measurements are concerned, the back-scatter processes are too complicated (and not well understood) to allow useful measurement accuracy to be attained.

=== The HF radar ===
The HF radar CODAR SeaSonde and Helzel WERA are well established as a powerful tool for sea current measurements up to a range of 300 km. It operates in the HF and low VHF frequencies band corresponding to a radar wavelength in the range of 10 to 300m. The Doppler shift of the first order Bragg lines of the radar echo is used to derive sea current estimates in very much the same way as for the dual frequency microwave radar. Two radar installations are normally required, looking at the same patch of the sea surface from different angles. The latest generation of shore-based ocean radar can reach more than 200 km for ocean current mapping and more than 100 km for wave measurements Helzel WERA. For all ocean radars, the accuracy in range is excellent. With shorter ranges, the range resolution gets finer. The angular resolution and accuracy depends on the used antenna array configuration and applied algorithms (direction finding or beam forming). The WERA system provides the option to use both techniques; the compact version with direction finding or the array type antenna system with beam forming methods.

=== Specialized X-Band ===
The FutureWaves technology was originally developed as an Environmental Ship and Motion Forecasting (ESMF) system for the Navy's ONR (Office of Naval Research) by General Dynamics' Applied Physical Sciences Corporation. The technology was adapted to be released in the commercial market and made its first public appearance at the 2017 Offshore Technology Conference in Houston Texas.

This technology differs from existing wave forecasting systems by using a customized wave sensing radar capable of measuring backscatter Doppler out to ranges of approximately 5 km. The radar antenna is vertically polarized to enhance the sea-surface backscatter signal. It also uses an innovative radar signal processing scheme that addresses the inherently noisy backscatter signals through a mathematical process termed least squares inversion. This approach applies a highly over-determined filter to the radar data, and rejects radar scans that do not observe incoming waves. The result is an accurate representation of the propagating incident wave field that will force ship motions over a 2-3 minute window. The wave processing algorithms also enable real-time calculation of wave field two-dimensional power spectra and significant wave height similar to that provided by a wave buoy.

It also uses a vessel motion prediction process that relies on a pre-calculated force/response database. Dynamic motional degrees of freedom are then represented as a lumped mechanical system whose future motions are predicted by numerically solving a multi-degree-of-freedom, forced, coupled differential equation with initial inertial state provided by vessel motion sensor outputs. The time-domain solution allows for nonlinear forcing mechanisms, such as quadratic roll damping and roll control systems, to be captured in the forecasting.

Finally, it uses the Gravity open architecture middleware solution to integrate the sensor feeds, processing subroutines and user displays. This open architecture approach allows for the implementation of customized operator displays along with physics based models of specific vessels and machinery (e.g. cranes) into the system.
