= Sensitivity time control =

Sensitivity time control (STC), also known as swept-gain control, is a system used to attenuate the very strong signals returned from nearby ground clutter targets in the first few range gates of a radar receiver. Without this attenuation, the receiver would routinely saturate due to the strong signals. This is used in air traffic control systems and has an influence on the shape of the elevation pattern of the surveillance antenna. It is represented in terms of numerical value typically expressed in decibels (dB), starting from zero, indicating that there is no muting and that the radar system is accepting all returns.

The radar equation is based on $1/range^4$, meaning that doubling the range to a target results in sixteen times less energy being returned. STC is due to the corollary of this statement - nearby targets return orders of magnitude more radio signal. In the case of a long-range radar with high power outputs, the return from nearby targets can be so powerful that it causes the amplifiers to saturate, producing a blank area on the screen beyond which nothing can be detected until the amplifiers return to normal operation again.

For early radar systems, the solution was to point the signal away from the ground. This can be difficult for ground or ship-based radars, which required other solutions. In the case of the ground-based AMES Type 7, for instance, the radars were installed in natural dish-like depressions so that all returns below a certain angle were cut off very close to the radar. This still had the same effect in terms of causing the amplifiers to saturate, but occurred so rapidly after transmission that the saturation decayed at relatively short ranges. The downside to this approach is that it permanently hides any signal below a certain angle, which for a very long-range system might prevent it from seeing anything near the radar site.

STC addresses this problem by implementing a reverse gain curve with the same characteristics as the radar equation, that is, a $1/range^4$ dependency or some function close to that (often there are discrete steps). This dramatically damps down amplification of signals received shortly after the detection pulse is sent, preventing them from saturating the receiver. The gain modification is reduced over time, until it reaches zero at some selected distance from the radar site, often on the order of 50 miles (80 km).

Because the system works by muting nearby signals, it may have the side-effect of eliminating small targets near the radar. This is fine for many applications, like air traffic control, where the targets are large and nearby aircraft are often guided using a local-area radar.
