= Douglas F6D Missileer =

Proposed US Navy fighter jet

F6D Missileer
- Artist's conception of the F6D-1 Missileer in flight

General information
- Type: Fleet defense fighter
- Manufacturer: Douglas Aircraft Company
- Status: Canceled
- Primary user: United States Navy (intended)
- Number built: 0

The Douglas F6D Missileer was a proposed carrier-based fleet defense fighter designed by Douglas Aircraft Company in response to a 1959 United States Navy requirement. It was designed to be able to loiter for extended periods at a relatively long distance from the Navy's aircraft carriers, engaging hostile aircraft 100 miles (160 km) away with its powerful radar and long-range missiles. Since the enemy would be fired on long before they reached visual range, the aircraft had little dogfighting capability and was strictly subsonic. When doubts were expressed about the Missileer's ability to defend itself after firing its missiles, the value of the project was questioned, leading to its cancellation. Some of the Missileer's systems, primarily the engines, radar, and missiles, continued development in spite of the cancellation, eventually emerging on the ill-fated General Dynamics–Grumman F-111B and successful Grumman F-14 Tomcat years later.

== Development ==
=== Background ===
Through the later part of the 1950s and into the 1960s, military air planners increasingly believed that future air combat would be carried out almost entirely by long-range missile fire. This changed the basic requirements for a fighter design considerably. The pilots would be expected to fight primarily through their radar and fire control systems, hopefully never even seeing their opponent. Because of this, the emphasis was on "head down" combat and an all-round view was considered unimportant. Radar systems were so complex that a pilot could not be expected to operate both the aircraft and the radar, so a second crewman, the "radar intercept officer", or "RIO", became a common fixture.

In the case of the Navy, the primary threat to their air operations would be high-speed aircraft attacking their aircraft carriers, potentially with long-range anti-ship missiles that were assumed to have nuclear warheads. Even if detected at long distances, these aircraft would be traveling so fast that the carrier-borne interceptors simply would not have enough time to launch and attack them before they had closed with the carriers. For instance, given a 100-mile (160 km) range on the shipboard radars, an aircraft traveling at Mach 2, about 1,400 mph (2,300 km/h), would close from initial detection to a five-mile (8 km) firing range in just over four minutes. In this time, an interceptor would have to launch, climb to altitude, maneuver into position, and fire.

One solution to this problem was to keep the interceptors in the air at all times. But given the short loiter times of high-performance aircraft like the F-4 Phantom, this would require huge fleets of fighters in order to keep a top cover in place while others were refueling. An aircraft with dramatically improved loiter times would be needed to make this approach practical. Another solution would be to increase the detection range, allowing more time for an interception. However, the detection range is largely a function of the radar horizon as seen from the radar mast, and there was little that could be done to extend this much beyond 100 miles (160 km). The solution here was to mount the search radar on aircraft, pushing the range out hundreds of miles from the ships.

=== Missileer forms ===
In 1957, the Navy began the formal process of ordering what they referred to as a "fleet defense fighter". They envisioned a large aircraft with loiter times on the order of six hours, supported by a dedicated radar aircraft providing early warning. In order to get the loiter times they wanted, the aircraft had to carry a large fuel load and was thus very large. The complex radar required dedicated operators, which resulted in a three-man crew. Additionally, they specified a side-by-side layout so both the pilot and co-pilot could concentrate on a single, centered radar display, avoiding duplication of equipment and helping reduce communications errors that could occur if they were looking at different screens. Since dogfighting was out of the question, the aircraft was strictly subsonic and did not require all-round visibility, suggesting a cockpit layout similar to the Grumman A-6 Intruder.

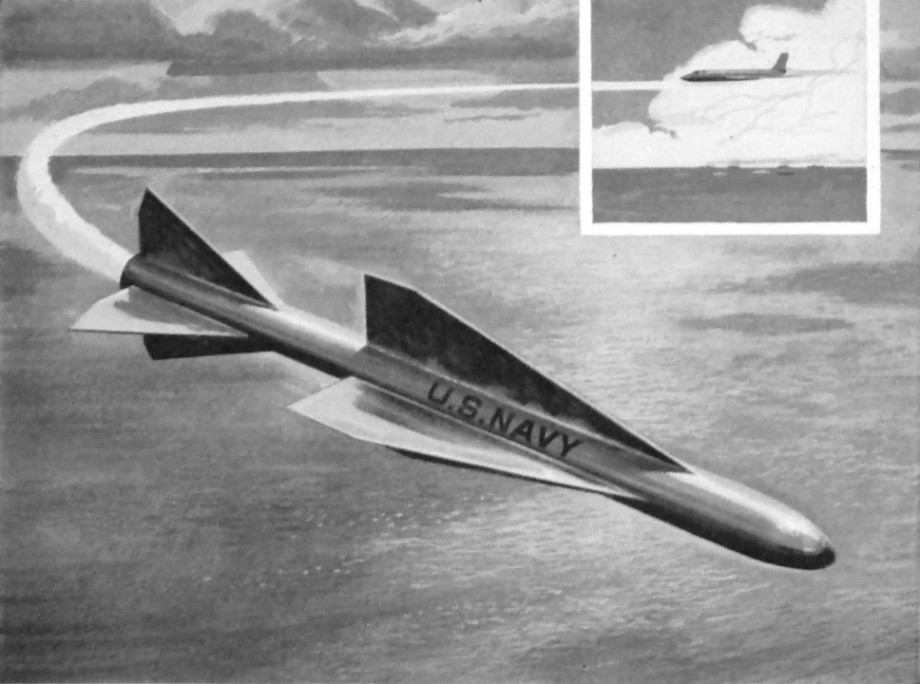
Artist's conception of the AAM-N-10 Eagle missile

The process formally started in December 1958 when Bendix was awarded a contract to develop the AAM-N-10 Eagle missile system After launch, the Eagle was boosted to Mach 3.5 by a large solid-propellant rocket booster, and then after a glide period, a long-burning sustainer motor slowly increased speed to Mach 4.5. Using a lofted trajectory that flew up and over the targets at high altitudes, the missile had an effective range of 160 miles (260 km). On final approach the missile activated its onboard radar, based on the AN/DPN-53 used in the CIM-10 Bomarc surface-to-air missile, using these signals for terminal active radar homing.

At the same time, Westinghouse won the contract to develop the AN/APQ-81 radar for the aircraft. This was an advanced pulse-Doppler radar system with a maximum range against bomber-sized targets at about 120 miles (190 km), and was able to track eight targets at a time in its track while scan mode at up to 80 miles (130 km). The radar also broadcast midcourse corrections to the missiles, and was in charge of calculating their lofted trajectories. The 120-mile (190 km) range of the AN/APQ-81 meant the Eagle could not be fired at its maximum effective range of 160 miles (260 km), but the Eagle also had a home-on-jam capability that allowed it to attack targets at its maximum range, although this was reduced in practice as it did not use midcourse corrections and flew directly at the target at lower altitudes.

To support the fighters, an improved early warning radar aircraft was needed, and Grumman won the contract with the W2F Hawkeye. It was equipped with the AN/APS-125 radar, which had a search range of 200 miles (320 km). This allowed a single Hawkeye to cover an area serviced by several of the fighters. Operators on these aircraft would pass information to the pilots of the interceptors, who would then use their own radars to lock on to the targets.

Finally, in July 1960, Douglas Aircraft won the contract for the aircraft itself, being selected over designs from North American Aviation and McDonnell Aircraft. They proposed using the relatively new turbofan engine design to improve fuel economy, and thus loiter time. Pratt & Whitney was selected to start development of the TF30 to fill this role. Other than that, the F6D design was typical of subsonic designs of years earlier, like their Douglas F3D Skyknight. It featured a large cockpit area well forward on the aircraft, above the large radar and avionics section in a somewhat bulbous arrangement with windows on the front area only. The two engines were mounted on the side of the aircraft under the straight wings, and the rest of the fuselage and tail section were very simple.

=== Cancellation ===
In order for the F6D "system" to work, a large number of technologies had to work at the same time. Among these were the new engines, radar, missiles, and the supporting early warning aircraft. Development of the F6D itself was highly likely to be successful and low cost, but the system as a whole was very risky and expensive.

Throughout the program, others in the Navy questioned the entire concept. They argued that, once the Missileer had fired its missiles, it would be completely unable to defend itself, and would have to return to the carrier as quickly as possible to re-arm. During that time, its slow speed and lack of dogfighting ability would make it an easy target for any escorting forces in the strike package. These arguments eventually won out, and, when combined with a desire to cut military spending in pursuit of a balanced budget, led to the cancellation of the F6D in December 1961.

However, the idea of a long-range interceptor was accepted even by those that did not support the F6D. Around this time, the Air Force had been studying its own interceptor needs and had made some progress on their North American XF-108 Rapier design, along with supporting radars and missiles. With the ending of the Missileer, the Navy turned to these projects to see if they could be adapted to their needs. Hughes had been working on the GAR-9 Falcon, a very large missile design similar to the Eagle in many ways. Hughes was also supplying the AN/ASG-18 radar system for the F-108, and while it was less advanced than the AN/APQ-81 and lacked track-while-scan, it had even greater range.

Although the F-108 was cancelled at about the same time as the Missileer, the Air Force was interested in keeping the weapons and radar programs alive for their Lockheed F-12 interceptor project. Hughes proposed that the systems could be adapted for Navy use as well, offering a newer version of the Falcon as the AAM-N-11 Phoenix, and a modified version of the radar as the AN/AWG-9. The Navy was eventually forced to participate in the TFX joint-services program that resulted in the General Dynamics/Grumman F-111B, which would have used these systems. When the F-111B ran into intractable problems in terms of aircraft performance as an air-to-air fighter and operational difficulties as a sea-based aircraft aboard aircraft carriers, the same systems were instead fitted to the F-14 Tomcat.

The Missileer's lasting contribution was not only its systems, but its engines. The TF30, with an afterburner, was used on both the F-111 and F-14, and turbofans are now commonplace in military jets. But while the TF30 was well-suited to the land-based fighter-bomber performance parameters of the F-111s and FB-111s operated by the U.S. Air Force and the Royal Australian Air Force, it was highly susceptible to compressor stalls in high angle-of-attack flight regimes and proved to be a marginal powerplant for the U.S. Navy's air superiority fighter-oriented F-14A Tomcat. Later versions of the F-14, the F-14B and F-14D, would replace the problematic TF30s with two General Electric F110 afterburning turbofan engines.

== Design ==
The F6D-1 would have weighed approximately 50,000 pounds (23,000 kg). It would have been powered by two Pratt & Whitney TF30-P2 non-afterburning turbofan engines which were more fuel efficient than the turbojets common at the time. It would have had subsonic performance, but a loiter time of six hours on station 150 nmi (280 km) from its carrier. Of conventional design with straight wings, and the engines in pods at the root, it resembled a larger version of the company's earlier F3D Skyknight. The Missileer's radar was to be the Westinghouse AN/APQ-81 pulse Doppler set, with a range of 138 miles (222 km) and "track while scan" capability. It was to be able to engage up to six targets simultaneously with the 100-mile (160 km)-range Eagle air-to-air missiles. The Eagle was to have a choice of conventional or nuclear warhead, and the Missileer would carry six of the weapons under its straight wings.

== Specifications (XF6D-1, as designed) ==
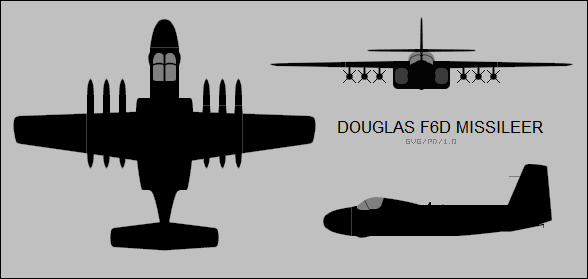
Three-view silhouette

Data from The American Fighter

General characteristics

- Crew: Three (pilot, co-pilot/radar operator, radar operator)
- Length: 53 ft (16 m)
- Wingspan: 70 ft (21 m)
- Height: 18 ft 1 in (5.5 m)
- Wing area: 630 sq ft (59 m^{2})
- Gross weight: 50,000 lb (22,680 kg)
- Max takeoff weight: 60,000 lb (27,216 kg)
- Powerplant: 2 × Pratt & Whitney TF30-P-2 turbofans, 10,200 lbf (45 kN) thrust each

Performance

- Maximum speed: 546 mph (879 km/h, 474 kn)
- Thrust/weight: 0.41

Armament

- 6 × AAM-N-10 Eagle air-to-air missiles

== See also ==
- AIM-54 Phoenix

Related development

- Douglas F3D Skyknight

Aircraft of comparable role, configuration, and era

- General Dynamics–Grumman F-111B

Related lists

- List of fighter aircraft
- List of United States Navy aircraft designations (pre-1962)
