= AN/AWG-9 =

Airborne all-weather multi-mode X-band pulse-Doppler radar

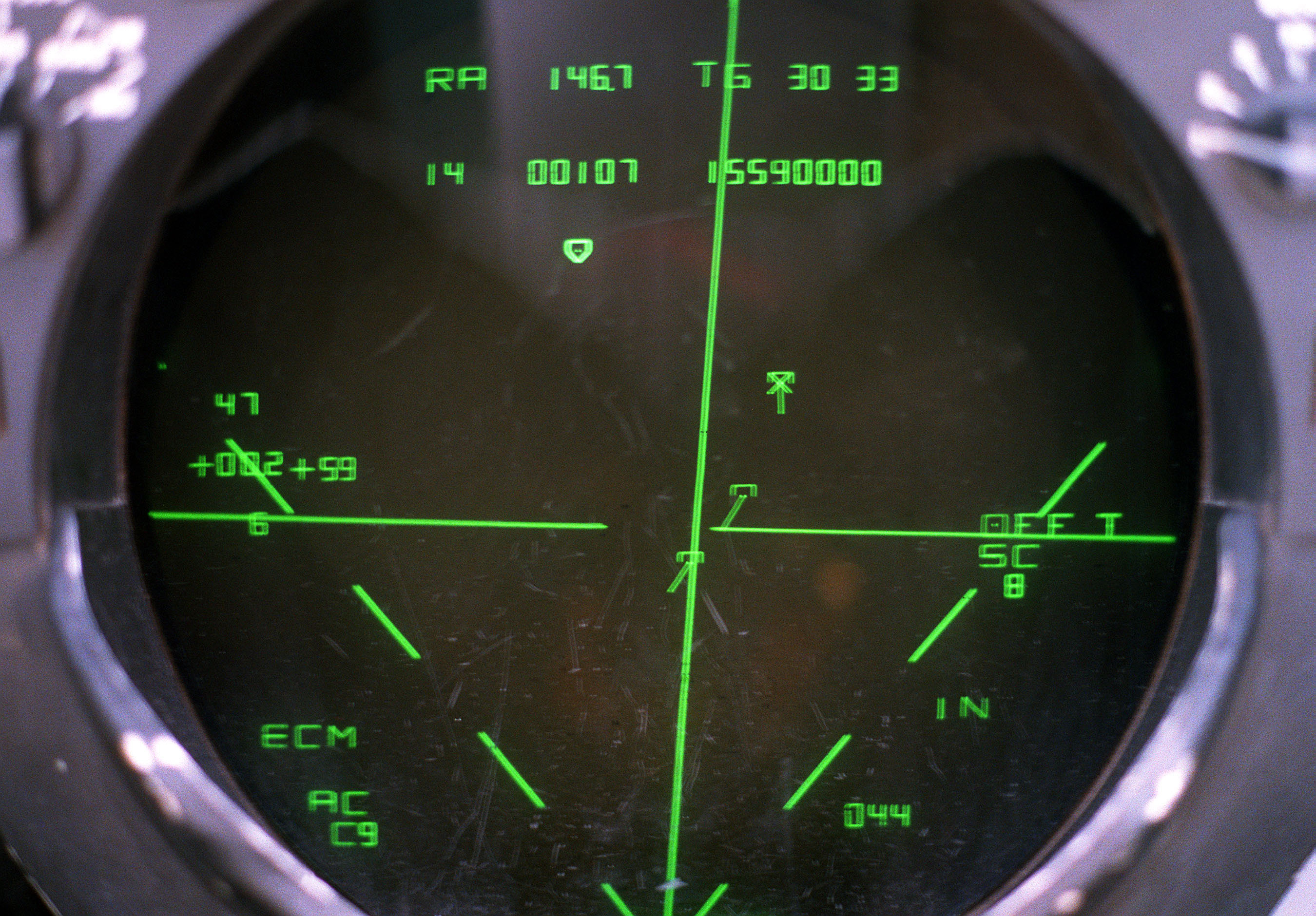
Tactical information display (TID) of radar data in the rear seat of an F-14A.

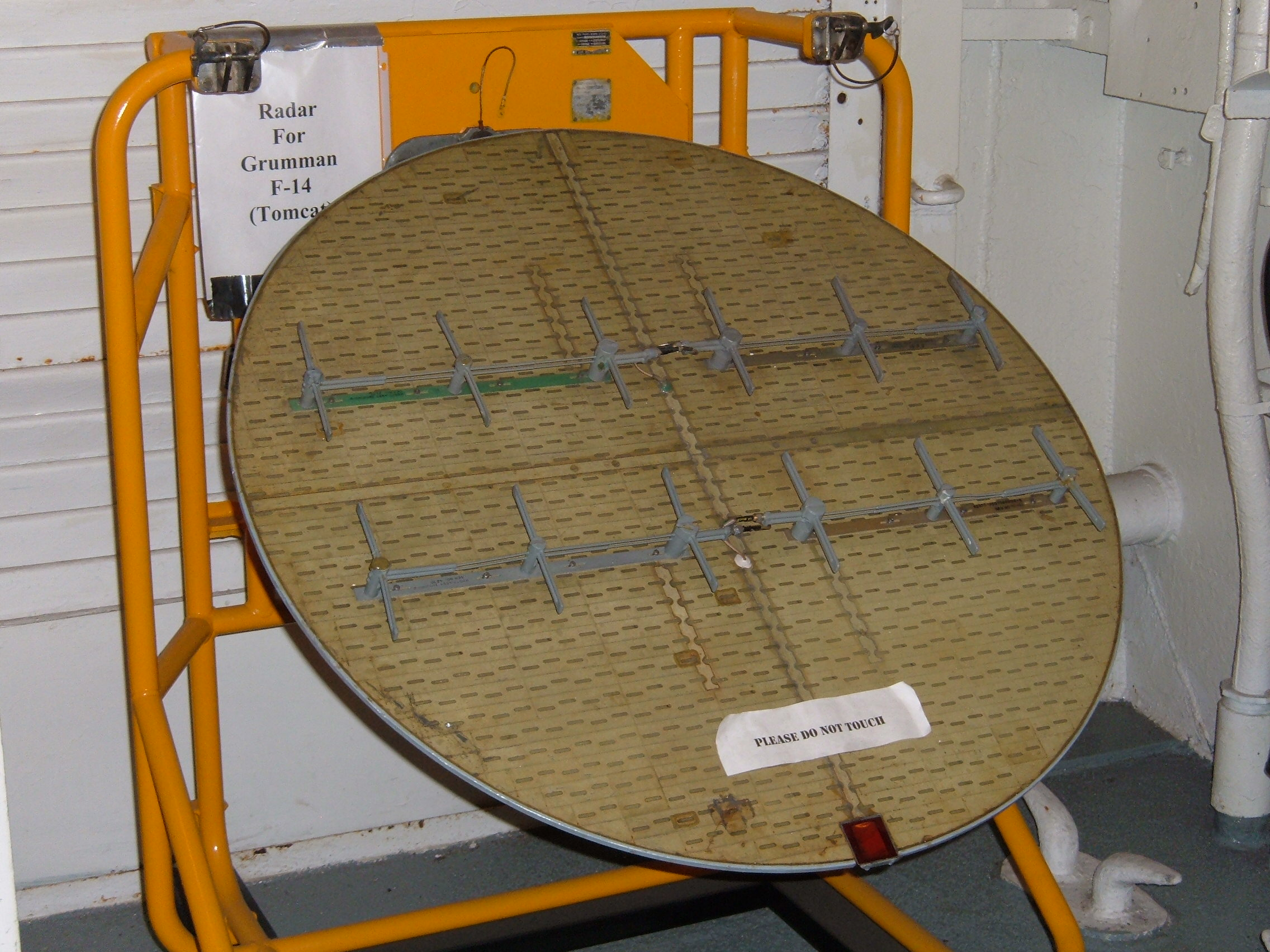
The radar antenna of an AN/AWG-9 on display in the USS Hornet Museum

The AN/AWG-9 and AN/APG-71 radars are all-weather, multi-mode X band pulse-Doppler radar systems used in the F-14 Tomcat, and also tested on TA-3B. It is a long-range air-to-air system capable of guiding several AIM-54 Phoenix using its track while scan mode. While the AWG-9 and the AIM-120 AMRAAM were tested on the F-14, the Navy never cleared the AIM-120 for use on the airplane, and never funded an effort to fully integrate the AIM-120 into the F-14's weapons system, nor to procure the AIM-120 for the F-14. The AWG-9 is a hybrid system: it utilizes an analog computer for radar receiver and signal processing and filtering functions, while a digital computer offers multiple target track and firing solutions. The APG-71 is an upgraded variant utilizing a digital computer for all functions. Both the AWG-9 and APG-71 were designed and manufactured by Hughes Aircraft Company's Radar Systems Group in Los Angeles; contractor support was later assumed by Raytheon. The AWG-9 was originally created for the canceled Navy F-111B program.

The AN/AWG-9 offers multiple air-to-air modes: long-range continuous-wave radar velocity search, range-while-search at shorter ranges, and an airborne track-while-scan mode with the ability to track up to 24 airborne targets, display 18 of them on the cockpit displays, and launch against 6 of them at the same time. This function was originally designed to allow the Tomcat to shoot down formations of bombers at long range.

== AN/AWG-9 ==
The AWG-9 was the result of a series of United States Navy programs to build what was known as a "fleet-defense fighter": an aircraft armed with extremely long-range radars and missiles that would be able to engage formations of enemy aircraft well-away from aircraft carriers. Their first attempt was the F6D Missileer, which combined Westinghouse's AN/APQ-81 pulse doppler radar with the Bendix AAM-N-10 Eagle missile. The Missileer was a relatively simple aircraft, and when planners expressed doubts about its ability to survive after firing its missiles, the Missileer was canceled and the Navy started looking for higher-performance alternatives.

At the same time, the U.S. Air Force had been working on a similar long-range interceptor project of their own, the XF-108 Rapier. The Rapier had much better performance than the Missileer, although its AIM-47 Falcon and AN/ASG-18 radar, both from Hughes, were smaller and less long ranged. The entire system was also very expensive, and the Rapier was canceled, replaced by the hopefully less-expensive Lockheed YF-12 adapted from the Lockheed A-12 spy plane. This project was also canceled as the strategic threat moved from bombers to ICBMs.

The same was not true for the Navy, where the threat remained crewed aircraft and early anti-ship missiles. Hughes suggested that the AN/ASG-18 and AIM-47 could be adapted for the Navy in slightly modified form, adding additional tracking capability while reducing the size of the radar antenna to a size more suitable for carrier aircraft. The result was the AN/AWG-9 radar and Phoenix missile.

All that was needed was a suitable airframe, which led to the Navy's involvement in the F-111B program. Although the radar and missile systems started to mature (after the better part of a decade at this point) the F-111B proved to be considerably overweight and had marginal performance, especially in engine-out situations. At the same time, real-world combat over Vietnam was proving that the idea of the all-missile fighter was simply not viable, and any fighter design would have to be able to dogfight with guns, which the F-111 was simply not suited to. This should not be surprising given the F-111's genesis as a tactical bomber and interdictor.

After many years in development and arguing with Congress, the Navy finally started development of a new aircraft specifically tailored to their needs. The new aircraft emerged as the F-14, armed with the same AWG-9/AIM-54 outfit originally intended for the F-111B. On the F-14, the AWG-9 is capable, and its doppler system allows it to have look-down, shoot-down capabilities.

The AWG-9's computer was built by Control Data Corporation's Government Systems Division; Control Data's model number for it was 5400B. Hughes engineers wrote and tested software for it in 1964, then loaded the code onto the first prototypes. Control Data released a programming manual for it in July of 1965. Control Data also supplied Hughes with five Advanced Multiprogrammable Processors (AMPP) to use on the ground in the AWG-9 weapon system control trainer, to train Navy Radar Intercept Officers. The AMPP emulated the CDC 5400B. The AWG-9 and AIM-54 were first flight-tested in 1966 aboard a TA-3. The test crew fired the missile at drones.

Hughes delivered enough AWG-9 systems and spares to equip approximately 600 F-14A/B aircraft for the Navy, and an additional 80 aircraft for the Iranian Air Force. All of the Navy systems have been retired; some of Iranian systems are still in service.

== AN/APG-71 ==
The APG-71 was a 1980s upgrade of the AWG-9 for use on the F-14D Tomcat. It incorporates technology and common modules developed for the APG-70 radar used in the F-15E Strike Eagle, providing significant improvements in (digital) processing speed, mode flexibility, clutter rejection, and detection range. The system features a low-sidelobe antenna, a sidelobe-blanking guard channel, and monopulse angle tracking; all of which are intended to make the radar less vulnerable to jamming.

The system itself is capable of a 460-mile (740 km) range, but the antenna design limits this to only 230 miles (370 km). Use of datalinked radar data allows two or more F-14Ds to operate the system at its maximum range.

Hughes delivered enough APG-71 radars and spares to equip all 55 F-14Ds produced or converted before the F-14D program was scaled back as a cost-cutting measure and eventually canceled. The F-14 was officially retired from United States Navy service on September 22, 2006, with the last flight occurring October 4, 2006.

== See also ==
- Index of aviation articles
- List of radars
- List of military electronics of the United States
- Joint Electronics Type Designation System
