= Republic XF-103 =

Cancelled American military plane project of the 1940s-1950s

XF-103
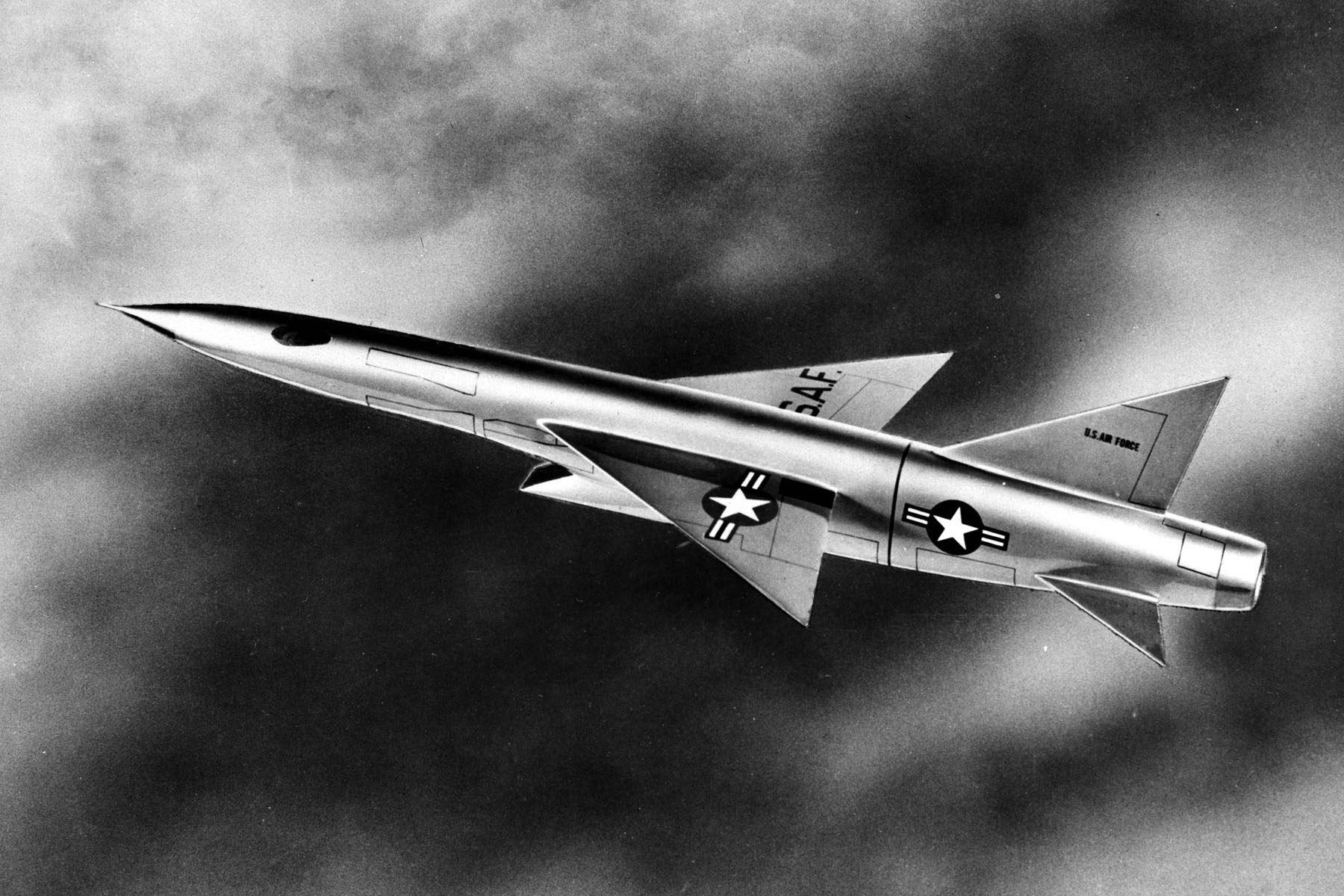
- Artist's impression of the XF-103

General information
- Type: Interceptor
- Manufacturer: Republic Aviation
- Status: Canceled at mock-up stage

The Republic XF-103 was an American project to develop a powerful missile-armed interceptor aircraft capable of destroying Soviet bombers while flying at speeds as high as Mach 3. Despite a prolonged development, it never progressed past the mockup stage.

== Development ==
In 1949, the USAF issued a request for an advanced supersonic interceptor to equip the Air Defense Command. Known formally as Weapon System WS-201A, but better known informally as the 1954 interceptor, it called for a supersonic aircraft with all-weather capability, powerful aircraft interception radar, and air-to-air missile armament. Republic was one of six companies to submit proposals. On 2 July 1951, three of the designs were selected for further development, Convair's scaled-up XF-92 that evolved into the F-102, a Lockheed design that led to the F-104, and Republic's AP-57. AP-57 was an advanced concept to be built almost entirely of titanium and capable of Mach 3 at altitudes of at least 60,000 feet (18 km).

A full-scale mock-up of the AP-57 was built and inspected in March 1953. A contract for three prototypes followed in June 1954. Work on the prototypes was delayed by continued problems with the titanium construction, and more by continuing problems with the proposed Wright J67 engine. The contract was later reduced to a single prototype. In the end, the J67 never entered production and the aircraft it had been chosen for were forced to turn to other engine designs, or were cancelled outright. Republic suggested replacing the J67 with the Wright J65, a much less powerful engine. The project was eventually cancelled on 21 August 1957 with no flying prototypes ever being completed.

The design was given a brief reprieve as part of the Long-Range Interceptor – Experimental (LRI-X) project that ultimately led to the North American XF-108 Rapier. Part of this project was the development of the advanced Hughes AN/ASG-18 pulse-doppler radar and the GAR-9 missile. Republic proposed adapting the F-103 as a testbed for these systems with additional fuel tanks taking up much of the original weapon bay spaces, although it wouldn't be able to come close to meeting the range requirements of LRI-X. Some work was carried out adapting the mockup to house the 40 inch antenna, which required the nose section to be scaled up considerably. Nothing ever came of the proposal, and testing of the ASG-18/GAR-9 was carried out on a modified Convair B-58 Hustler instead.

== Design ==
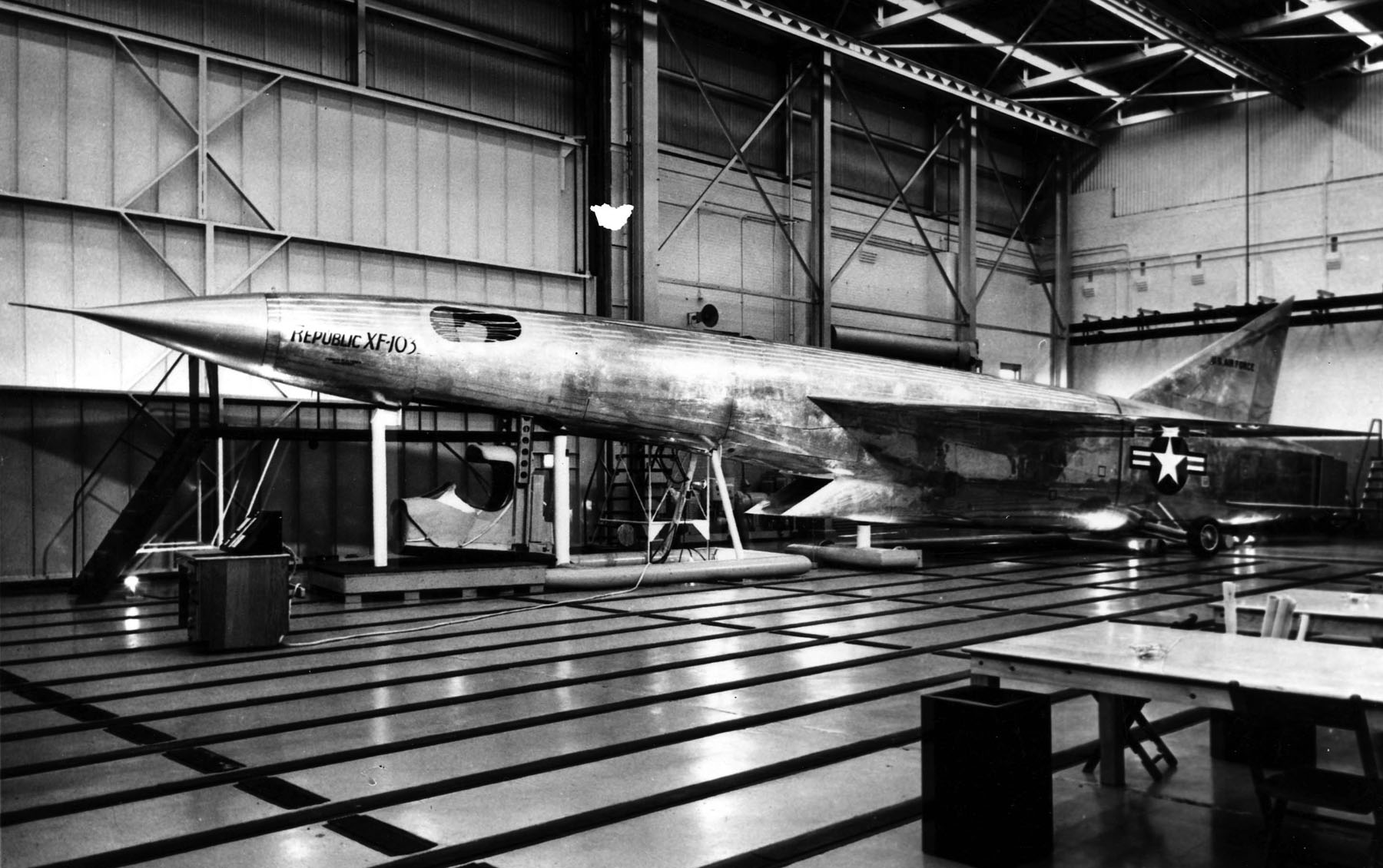
A mock-up of the F-103 was built at the Republic factory. In this image, the pilot's capsule is shown in its lowered position.

=== Propulsion ===
Mach 3 performance in the 1950s was difficult to achieve. Jet engines compress incoming air, then mix it with fuel and ignite the mixture. The resulting expansion of gases produces thrust. The compressors generally can ingest air only at subsonic speeds. To operate supersonically, aircraft use advanced intakes to slow the supersonic air to a usable speed. The energy lost in this process heats the air, which means the engine has to operate at ever-higher temperatures to provide net thrust. The limiting factor in this process is the temperature of the materials in the engines, in particular, the turbine blades just behind the combustion chambers. Using materials available at the time, speeds much beyond Mach 2.5 were difficult to achieve.

The solution to this problem is the removal of the turbine. The ramjet engine consists mostly of a large tube, and is relatively easy to air-cool by forcing extra air around the engine. Experimental ramjet aircraft of the era, like the Lockheed X-7, were reaching speeds as high as Mach 4. There are numerous problems with the ramjet engine, however. Fuel economy, or thrust specific fuel consumption in aircraft terms, is extremely poor. This makes general operations like flying from one airbase to another expensive propositions. More problematic is the fact that ramjets rely on forward speed to compress the incoming air, and only become efficient above Mach 1.

Alexander Kartveli, Republic's Chief Designer, devised a solution to these problems. He proposed using a Wright J67 turbojet (a license-built derivative of the Bristol Olympus) supplemented by an RJ55-W-1 ramjet behind it. Connecting the two were a series of movable ducts that could route air between the engines. At low speeds the aircraft would be powered by the J67, with the RJ55 acting as a traditional afterburner, producing a total of about 40,000 lbf (180 kN) thrust. At high speeds, starting above Mach 2.2, the jet engine would be shut down and the airflow from the intake would be routed around the jet engine and directly into the RJ55. Although the net thrust was reduced by shutting down the jet, operating on the ramjet alone allowed the aircraft to reach much higher speeds.

Both engines were located behind a single very large ventral Ferri-type intake, which used a prominent, swept-forward lip, a configuration also used for the wing-root inlets on the F-105 Thunderchief. The J67 was installed just behind the intake, angled with its intake below the centerline of the aircraft. The RJ55 was installed inline with the fuselage in the extreme rear, as if it were the exhaust of a conventional engine installation. There was a significant empty space above the J67 for ducting.

=== Wings and control surfaces ===
All of the control surfaces were pure delta wings. The main wing was swept at 55 degrees, and could be rotated around the spar to provide variable incidence. For takeoff and landing, the wing was tilted upwards to increase the angle of incidence while keeping the fuselage nearly horizontal. The length of the fuselage made it difficult to achieve the same end by tilting the entire aircraft upwards, which would have required a very long extension on the landing gear. The system also allowed the fuselage to fly flat to the airflow at various speeds, setting the angle of incidence independent of the aircraft as a whole. This decreased trim drag, thus improving range.

The wing was split at about two-thirds of the span. The portion outside of this line able to rotate independently of the rest of the wing. These movable portions acted as large ailerons, or as Republic called them, tiperons. To keep the surface area in front and behind the pivot point somewhat similar, the split line was closer to the fuselage in front of the pivot. Large conventional flaps ran from the fuselage to the tiperons. Hard points for drop tanks were available at about 1/3 of the way out from the wing root.

The horizontal stabilizers were seemingly undersized, and mounted below the line of the wing. The larger vertical fin was supplemented by a ventral fin for high-speed stability. This fin folded to the right, as seen from behind, during takeoff and landing to avoid hitting the ground. Two petal-style air brakes were mounted directly behind the horizontal surfaces, opening out and up at about a 45° angle into the gap between the horizontal and vertical surfaces. A provision for a braking parachute is not evident on the mock-up or the various artwork, although this was common for aircraft of the era.

=== Fuselage ===
The fuselage was completely smooth, with a high fineness ratio for low drag at supersonic speeds. The design was developed prior to the discovery of the area rule, and does not display any of the wasp waisting common to aircraft primarily developed after 1952. The fuselage contours were mainly cylindrical, but blended into the intake starting around the wing root, giving it a rounded, rectangular profile through the middle, before reverting to a pure cylinder shape again at the engine nozzle.

=== Cockpit ===
The cockpit design originally featured a canopy, but low drag requirements for high speed suggested that it be removed. The idea of using a periscope arrangement for forward viewing on high speed aircraft was then in vogue, the Avro 730 selecting a very similar system. The Air Force demanded that it be used on the F-103. Kartveli was opposed to this layout, and continued to press for the use of a "real" canopy. Design documents throughout the program continued to include this as an optional feature, along with performance estimates that suggested the difference would be minimal.

The system shown on mockups used two large oval windows on the cockpit sides, and a periscope system projecting an image onto a Fresnel lens arrangement directly in front of the pilot. In 1955, the periscope concept was tested on a modified F-84G, which was flown on a long, cross-country flight with the pilot's forward vision blocked. (Note: The F-84G testbed (s/n 51-843) accumulated nearly 50 hours of flight testing with pilots reporting the periscope system worked extremely well.)

A unique supersonic escape capsule was designed for the XF-103. The pilot's seat was located in a shell with a large movable shield in front that was normally slid down into the area in front of the pilot's legs. In the case of depressurization, the shield would slide up in front of the pilot, sealing the seat into a pressurized pod. Basic flight instruments inside the capsule allowed the aircraft to be flown back to base, and a window in the front of the shield allowed the periscope system to be used. In an emergency, the entire capsule would be ejected downward, along with a small portion of the aircraft fuselage that provided a stable aerodynamic shape. To enter and exit the aircraft, the ejection module was lowered on rails out of the bottom of the aircraft, allowing the pilot to simply walk into the seat, sit down, and raise the module into the aircraft. The capsule was fully pressurized, allowing the pilot to continue operating the aircraft without a pressure suit when the capsule was locked up.

=== Avionics and armament ===
The entire nose of the aircraft was taken up by the large Hughes radar set, which (at the time) offered long detection ranges. Guidance and fire control were to be provided by the same MX-1179 package being developed for all of the WS-201 designs. Hughes had won this contract with their Hughes MA-1 fire control system, which was under development. Weapons were carried in bays located on the sides of the fuselage behind the cockpit, which opened by flipping upward, thereby rotating the missiles out of their bays. It was to be armed with six GAR-1/GAR-3 Falcon (then known as MX-904), with a likely arrangement of three or four each GAR-1s and GAR-3s, fired in pairs (one each radar and infrared guided) to improve the odds of a hit. The XF-103 also was to feature 36 2.75-inch "Mighty Mouse" FFARs.

== Specifications (XF-103, as designed) ==
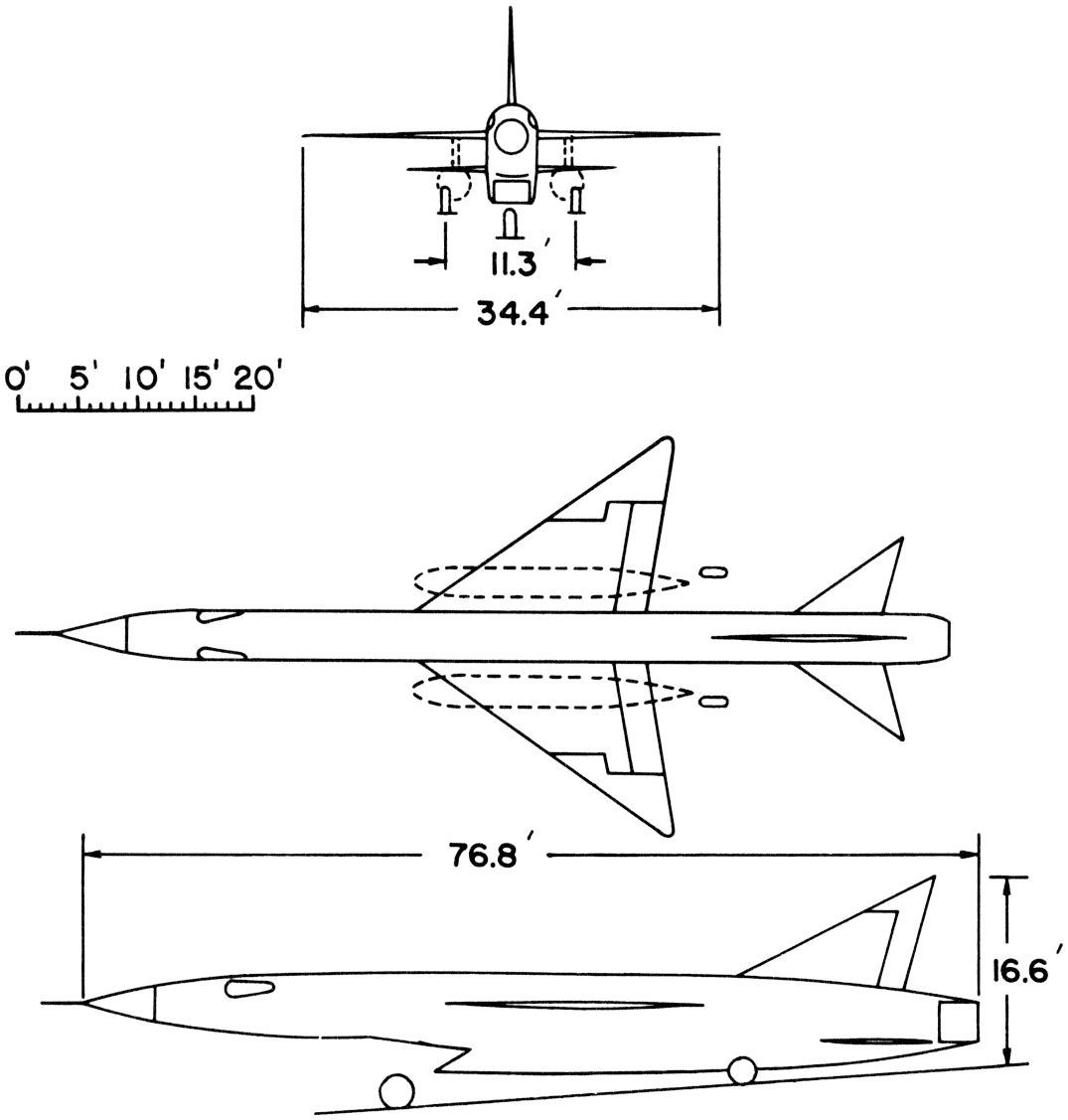
3-view line drawing of the Republic XF-103

General characteristics

- Crew: one pilot
- Length: 77 ft 0 in (23.5 m)
- Wingspan: 34 ft 5 in (10.5 m)
- Height: 16 ft 7 in (5.1 m)
- Wing area: 401 sq ft (37.2 m^{2})
- Empty weight: 24,949 lb (11,317 kg)
- Gross weight: 38,505 lb (17,466 kg)
- Max takeoff weight: 42,864 lb (19,443 kg)
- Powerplant: 1 × Wright XJ67-W-3 turbojet, 15,000 lbf (67 kN) thrust
- Powerplant: 1 × Wright XRJ55-W-1 ramjet, 18,800 lbf (84 kN) thrust

Performance

- Maximum speed: Mach 3 (as a turbojet) / Mach 5 (ramjet-only)
- Service ceiling: 80,000 ft (24,390 m)
- Rate of climb: 19,000 ft/min (97 m/s)
- Wing loading: 96 lb/sq ft (470 kg/m^{2})
- Thrust/weight: 0.57 (afterburner only); 0.95 (afterburner and ramjet)
- Combat radius: 245 mi (394 km)
- Ferry range: 1,545 mi (2,486 km)

Armament

- Rockets: 36 x 2.75 in (70 mm) FFAR rockets
- Missiles: 6 or 4 x GAR-1/GAR-3 AIM-4 Falcon air-to-air missiles

== See also ==
- Century Series

Aircraft of comparable role, configuration, and era

- Nord 1500 Griffon
- North American XF-108 Rapier

== Bibliography ==
- Crickmore, Paul, Lockheed Blackbird: Beyond the Secret Missions. Oxford, UK: Osprey, 2004. ISBN 978-1-84176-694-2.
- Jenkins, Dennis R. "Titanium Titan: The Story of the XF-103." Airpower, January 2004.
- Jenkins, Dennis R. and Tony R. Landis. Experimental & Prototype U.S. Air Force Jet Fighters. Minnesota: Specialty Press, 2008. ISBN 978-1-58007-111-6.
- Jenkins, Dennis R. and Tony R. Landis. Valkyrie: North American's Mach 3 Superbomber. North Branch, Minnesota: Specialty Press Publishers & Wholesalers, 2004. ISBN 1-58007-072-8.
- Pace, Steve. X-Fighters: USAF Experimental and Prototype Fighters, XP-59 to YF-23. St. Paul, Minnesota: Motorbooks International, 1991. ISBN 0-87938-540-5.
