= F108 =

F108 may refer to:

- CFM International CFM56 turbofan, a US Department of Defense designation
- XF-108 Rapier
