= Look-down/shoot-down =

Radar system capability

A radar system has look-down/shoot-down capability if it can detect, track and guide a weapon to an air target that (as seen by the radar) is silhouetted against the ground.

== Problem and naming ==
Airborne intercept radar relying exclusively on time domain radar techniques is effectively blind any time the radar's antenna is aimed towards the Earth's surface. That is because pointing the radar at the ground produces a large reflection. That reflection and the ensuing "cluttered" display overwhelms human operators and computing systems (see ground clutter). Radar systems of this type are essentially useless when pointed ‘down’ at the surface, with the zone of weakness near and below the horizon. This zone can be actively utilized by enemy combatants wishing to hide from radar tracking.

Frequency domain signal processing combined with time domain signal processing, as in pulse-Doppler radar, is a way to eliminate that vulnerability.

=== Look down ===
Militaries require performance of airborne intercept radar under all aspects, including downwards. By using techniques to effectively remove clutter, human operators and computers can focus on targets of interest. This allows the radar system to "look down", and that eliminates the zone of weakness. Military air combat vehicles that lack this capability are blind to targets below and along the line of the horizon and therefore unable to engage or attack them.

=== Shoot down ===
Once the radar can "look down", it is subsequently desirable to "shoot down". Various weapons systems (including guns and missiles) are then employed against designated radar targets, either relying on the aircraft's radar employing the "look down" capability (as in semi-active radar homing) or the weapon's own active radar to resolve the indicated target (as in active radar homing).

== Concept ==
The technical challenge encountered by airborne radar is discerning relatively small radar returns (e.g. other aircraft, targets) in the presence of large radar returns (e.g. terrain return) when the radar is pointed at the ground, "looking down". The ground strongly reflects the radar energy while the target relatively weakly reflects the radar energy, creating confusing clutter on the radar screen. It is difficult or impossible to separate the radar image of low-flying aircraft from the surrounding ground clutter.

Look-down/shoot-down radars have been enhanced with electronic programs that process the radar image and search for moving objects, which are detected by looking for Doppler shifts in the radar return. See moving target indication. The radar removes all stationary objects (e.g. the ground and buildings) from the display and shows only moving objects. Since the radar is linked to the aircraft's fire control system, it can provide targeting information to weapons once it has detected a moving object.

Look-down/shoot-down radars provide combat aircraft with the ability to engage targets flying below them. This is highly desirable, as it allows an aircraft to detect and attack targets whilst maintaining the tactically advantageous position conferred by superior altitude.

== History ==
The Hughes AN/ASG-18 fire control system was a prototype airborne radar/combination system for the planned North American XF-108 Rapier interceptor aircraft for the United States Air Force, and later for the Lockheed YF-12. The US's first pulse-Doppler radar, the system had look-down/shoot-down capability and could track one target at a time. Flight tests of the AN/ASG-18 system, using a modified Convair B-58, began in 1960. During the 1960s, YF-12 flight tests were conducted, which included the use of the YF-12's onboard AN/ASG-18 radar system in conjunction with AIM-47 missiles to shoot down target drones.

A look-down/shoot-down airborne radar was developed by ELTA Ltd, a subsidiary of Israel Aircraft Industry (IAI) in response to an Israeli Air-Force operational requirement, resulting from lessons learned during the Six Day War in 1967. ELTA pioneered and proved the feasibility of installing a light-weight Coherent Pulse-Doppler radar in a fighter aircraft. First prototype was successfully tested in 1970. The radar (ELM-2001) was installed on the Israeli "Kfir" fighter and went operational in 1974.

Practical pulse-Doppler signal processing requires high-power light-weight solid state computing that became available in the early 1970s. The first aircraft to rely completely on its own radar system is the F-4 Phantom. The F-4J had the Westinghouse AN/AWG-10 fire control system (making the F-4J the first fighter in the world with operational look-down/shoot-down capability).

The Soviet Union introduced its first look-down/shoot-down radar with the Sapfir-23P on the Mikoyan MiG-23 interceptor. This made it harder for U.S. Air Force bombers and cruise missiles to penetrate the Soviet airspace at low altitude (terrain masking), without being detected.

When speaking of coalition air operations during the 1991 Persian Gulf War, General Charles Horner described the F-15's look down/shoot down radar, "During the first three days of the war, when control of the air was greatly contested, what it basically amounted to was the Iraqi aircraft would take off, pull up their landing gear, and blow up."
