= Track while scan =

Radar operation mode

Track-while-scan (TWS) is a mode of radar operation in which the radar allocates part of its power to tracking a target or targets (up to forty with modern radar) while part of its power is allocated to scanning. It is similar to but functions differently in comparison to its counterparts range-while-search (RWS), long range search (LRS), air combat mode (ACM), velocity search with ranging (VSR) and combined radar mode (CRM). In track-while-scan mode the radar has the ability to acquire and lock/track multiple targets while simultaneously providing a view of the surrounding airspace, which in turn aids the pilot and or operator in maintaining better situational awareness.

== Background ==
Early airborne radar systems generally operated purely as tracking systems, with a dedicated radar operator manually "tuning" the system to locate targets in a relatively narrow field-of-view in front of the aircraft. The searching area could be moved using a variety of methods, typically phase-shifting or lobe switching on lower frequency systems that required large antennas, or by moving the radar dish on microwave frequency radars. Engagements would start with ground controllers guiding the aircraft into the general area of the target via voice commands to the pilot, and once the aircraft got into range its own radar would pick up the target for the final approach when the radar operator would provide voice commands to the pilot. There was no real distinction between seeking out a target and tracking it.

Ground-based radars like the SCR-584 automated this process early in their evolution. In search mode the SCR-584 rotated its antenna through 360 degrees and any returns were plotted on a plan position indicator (PPI). This gave the operators an indication of any targets within its ~25 mile detection range and their direction relative to the radar van. When one of the returns was considered interesting, the radar was flipped to tracking mode and "locked-on". From then on it would automatically keep its antenna pointed at the target, feeding out accurate direction, altitude and range information on a B-Scope display. Operator workload was greatly reduced.

Advances in electronics meant it was only a matter of time before automated radars like the SCR-584 could be reduced in size and weight enough to fit into an aircraft. These started appearing in the late 1950s and remained common until the 1980s.

The introduction of semi-active radar homing missiles made the lock-on concept especially important. These missiles use the launching aircraft's own radar to "paint" the target with a radar signal, the missile listens for the signal being reflected off the target to home in on. This requires the radar to be locked on in order to provide a steady guidance signal. The drawback is that once the radar is set to tracking a single target, the operator loses information about any other targets. This is the problem that track while scan is meant to address.

In traditional radar systems, the display is purely electrical; signals from the radar dish are amplified and sent directly to an oscilloscope for display. There is a one-to-one correspondence between "blips" on the display and a radio signal being received from the antenna. When the antenna is not pointed in a particular direction, the signal from any targets in that direction simply disappear. To improve the operator's ability to read the display, the oscilloscopes typically used a slowly fading phosphor as a crude form of "memory".

== Track while scan ==
Track while scan radars became possible with the introduction of two new technologies: phased-array radars and computer memory devices. Phased-array antennas became practical with the introduction of tunable high-power coherent radio frequency oscillators in the 1960s. By shifting the phase slightly between a series of antennas, the resulting additive signal can be steered and focused electronically. Much more important to the development of TWS was the development of digital computers and their associated memories, which allowed the radar data to be remembered from scan to scan.

TWS radars disconnect the display from the antenna, sending the signals to a computer instead of the display. The computer interprets the signal and develops a "track file" for anything that would have normally caused a blip. The next time the radar returns to that area, any returns are correlated with the original recording, and the track file is updated or discarded as appropriate. A second system continuously reads the data in the track files from memory, and displays this on the radar as a series of annotated icons. Unlike the straight tracking mode, TWS radars have to solve an additional problem of recognizing whether each target discrimination/detection defines a new target or belongs to already tracked targets.

With the location of targets known even when the radar antenna is not pointed at them, TWS radars can return to the same area of sky on their next scan and beam additional energy toward the target. So in spite of the radar not constantly painting the target as it would in a traditional lock-on, enough energy is sent in that direction to allow a missile to track. A phased array antenna helps here, by allowing the signal to be focused on the target when the antenna is in that direction, without it having to be pointed directly at the target. This means that the target can be painted for a longer period of time, whenever the antenna is in the same general direction. Advanced phased array radars make this even easier, allowing a signal to be continually directed at the target.

However, the first operational track-while-scan radar in history was neither passive electronically scanned array nor active electronically scanned array radar. It was actually the Soviet-made missile guidance, target detection and tracking radar known as B-200, firstly designed in 1953 by KB-1 (today known as NPO Almaz), as a part of multi-channel, stationary anti-aircraft missile system designated as S-25 (Sistema-25, initial name Berkut - Golden eagle, in English) or SA-1 Guild (by NATO designation), which was intended exclusively for defense against possible massive air raid on Moscow and especially Kremlin from long-range strategic USAF bombers (especially the ones like B-47 and later B-52, capable of stratospheric flights, which made them completely immune to ordinary anti-aircraft guns).

Since the S-25 was also designed as the first multi-channel missile system in history (the first one which had the ability to engage multiple targets completely simultaneously - as much as twenty targets by a single battery, each with up to three missiles), it thus required a proper radar capable of fulfilling such a demanding task, what ultimately resulted in creation of the B-200, as the very first fire-control radar intended for multiple guidance of missiles on multiple different air targets, what was ensured exactly by its TWS ability.

Rather than using later phased-array antennas and multiprocessor digital computers (both which did not exist yet back in the time) the TWS ability in B-200 was actually achieved by an alternative method, that is, by the so-called "brute use of force" approach (B-200 featured massive and very bulky electronics featuring many analog computers together with its own power supply in shape of heavy generators, regulators, stabilizers and ventilators, all which were placed inside a relatively large concrete bunker). The USSR created 56 of those radar sites between 1954 and 1956 (as many as there were S-25 missile sites) in two large concentric rings around Moscow which represented two lines of anti-aircraft defense, each of them featuring multiple S-25 sites (34 of those were located on the outer and remaining 22 on the inner ring).

The B-200 was a 3D, UHF, S/E-band radar, which had instrumented detection range of 150 km and ability to track as much as 30 different targets simultaneously (on 20 of those it could also launch S-25 missiles), while still scanning for new targets. It was the first radar in the world capable of such features, which will be surpassed for the first time yet half a century later, by modern Russian S-400 system (whose 92N2 fire-control radar can engage as much as 80 different targets simultaneously, each with two missiles). The B-200 also featured unique and advanced design for its time as well as an unusual operating mode; consisting of two symmetrical antennas (one intended for azimuth and the other one for elevation surveillance), each featuring two hexagonal, diamond-shaped discs (each as much as 10 meters high), both which were rotating around its own axles (like a propeller or windmill) in mutually opposite directions and as fast as 50 turns per minute, which enabled them as much as target scans. The B-200 together with S-25 were serving as Moscow's main line of defense against possible air raid for almost 30 years (1955-1982), until later being surpassed by self-propelled, long-range missile system S-300 (nowadays S-400), mainly due to complete immobility of the whole S-25 system.

Despite not falling in category of modern phased-array radars, the B-200 is nevertheless also considered to be the first modern fire-control radar in history (the one intended for missile guidances), since most of the today's radars of the type share the TWS ability.

From the Western side, the first operational TWS radar was the Royal Navy's (RN) Type 984 naval radar, which firstly appeared three years later than Soviet B-200 ground-based radar (in 1956), with only three such radars manufactured (for three Royal Navy aircraft carriers - HMS Eagle, Hermes and Victorious). Also, the Type 984 was not a fire-control radar and was thus not intended for guidance of missiles, but a radar intended for ground-controlled interception as well as an early warning radar, due to which also required TWS ability. It was the first Western radar which featured ability to engage aircraft on multiple airborne targets while still simultaneously scanning for new ones. The Type 984 was also the first naval TWS radar in history.

In the United States, the original tracking radar system was the Semi-Automatic Ground Environment (SAGE) system developed for the US Air Force in 1958. SAGE required enormous computers to develop and maintain tracks for up to dozens of aircraft. Early airborne TWS radar typically only tracked a single target while scanning. The original TWS airborne set was the Hughes Aircraft AN/ASG-18 of the XF-108 Rapier, which could track a single target. The Westinghouse AN/APQ-81 for the F6D Missileer was more advanced, tracking up to eight targets, but required its own operator.

It was not until the introduction of digital computers, and especially microprocessors, that TWS in airborne applications became practical. Development of TWS generally followed the development of the microprocessors that eventually powered them; the AN/AWG-9 of the F-14 Tomcat used an Intel 8080 and could track 24 targets.

== See also ==
- Index of aviation articles
- Track before detect
- Type 984 radar
