= AAM-N-10 Eagle =

Canceled US air-to-air missile

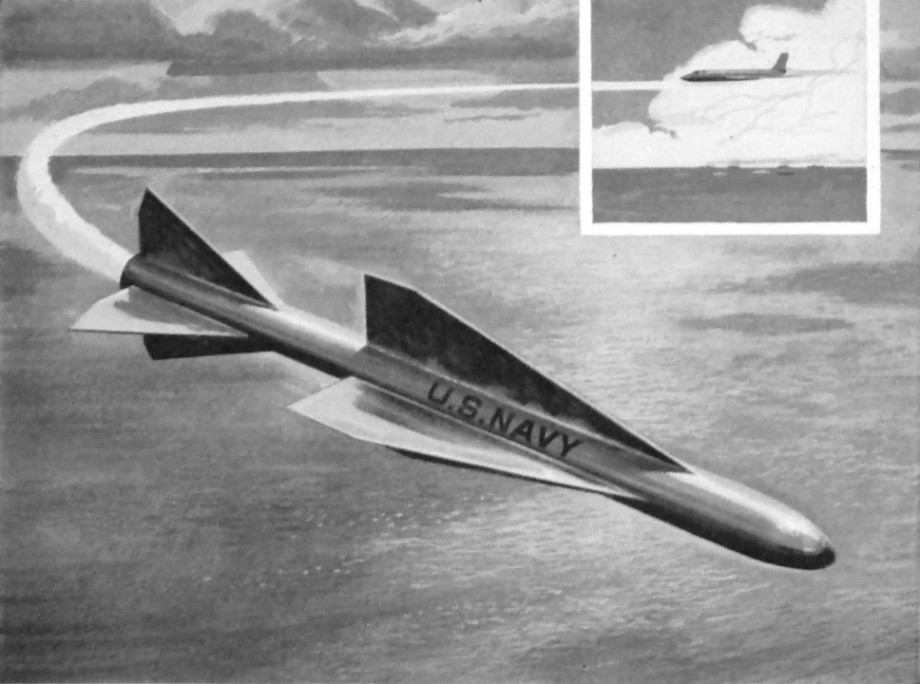
- Type: Long-range Air-to-air missile
- Place of origin: United States

Service history
- Used by: United States Navy

Production history
- Designed: 1958
- Manufacturer: Bendix Corporation
- No. built: 0

Specifications (projected)
- Mass: 650 lb (290 kg) without booster 1,284 lb (582 kg) with booster
- Length: 11 ft 7 in (3.53 m) without booster 16 ft 1.5 in (4.915 m) with booster
- Diameter: 14 in (360 mm) booster 16 in (410 mm)
- Wingspan: 2 ft 10 in (0.86 m) booster 4 ft 2.1 in (1.273 m) folding
- Operational range: 110 nmi (130 mi; 200 km) powered 160 nmi (180 mi; 300 km) aerodynamic
- Flight ceiling: 100,000 ft (30,000 m)
- Maximum speed: Mach 4.5
- Guidance system: inertial with radio correction midcourse active radar or home-on-jam terminal
- References: Parsch 2003

The AAM-N-10 Eagle was a long-range air-to-air missile developed by the Bendix Corporation for use by the United States Navy. Intended for carriage by the Douglas F6D Missileer fleet defense fighter, the Eagle program was cancelled before testing could begin, but the lessons learned were used in the development of the AIM-54 Phoenix missile.

== Design and development ==
Development of the AAM-N-10 began in 1957 with the definition of the fleet defense fighter: a subsonic, long-endurance interceptor aircraft carrying a powerful radar set and very-long-range missiles, capable of shooting down enemy bombers at the greatest possible distance from the aircraft carriers they were attempting to attack. In 1958, Douglas Aircraft was contracted to develop the F6D-1 Missileer fighter, and the Bendix Corporation received a contract that December for the AAM-N-10 Eagle missile.

Eagle was of conventional design for heavy air-to-air missiles of the time, with very low-aspect ratio, nearly delta wing fins of 2-foot-10-inch (0.86 m) span extending the length of the missile's 11-foot-7-inch (3.53 m) body, and a detachable booster stage to allow the missile to accelerate hard at launch before settling into a cruise configuration over the extended distance to the target. The airframe of the missile was subcontracted by Bendix to Grumman Aircraft; Aerojet was subcontracted to build the AAM-N-10's rocket motors. The booster would propel the Eagle to a speed of Mach 3.5; following ignition of the sustainer, the missile would slowly accelerate to a Mach 4.5 cruise speed. A conventional high explosive warhead was standard, and Eagle was designed to be capable of carrying a W42 nuclear warhead.

The Eagle utilized midcourse radio command guidance, with signals from the launch aircraft being transmitted to keep the missile on course as it flew an energy-efficient 'lofted' trajectory to the target area. As it neared the target, the AAM-N-10 would switch to active radar homing, its own onboard radar set, derived from the AN/DPN-53 radar carried by the CIM-10 Bomarc surface-to-air missile, which utilized a similar flight profile – steering the missile to its target. Launch could be at distances of up to 160 nautical miles (180 mi; 300 km) from the target; the AN/APQ-81 radar designed for the Missileer was only capable of detecting targets at 120 nautical miles (140 mi; 220 km) range, however the launch aircraft could be cued to a target by an airborne early warning aircraft, launching its missiles to cruise to the target area, where they would use a secondary home-on-jam guidance system for terminal homing.

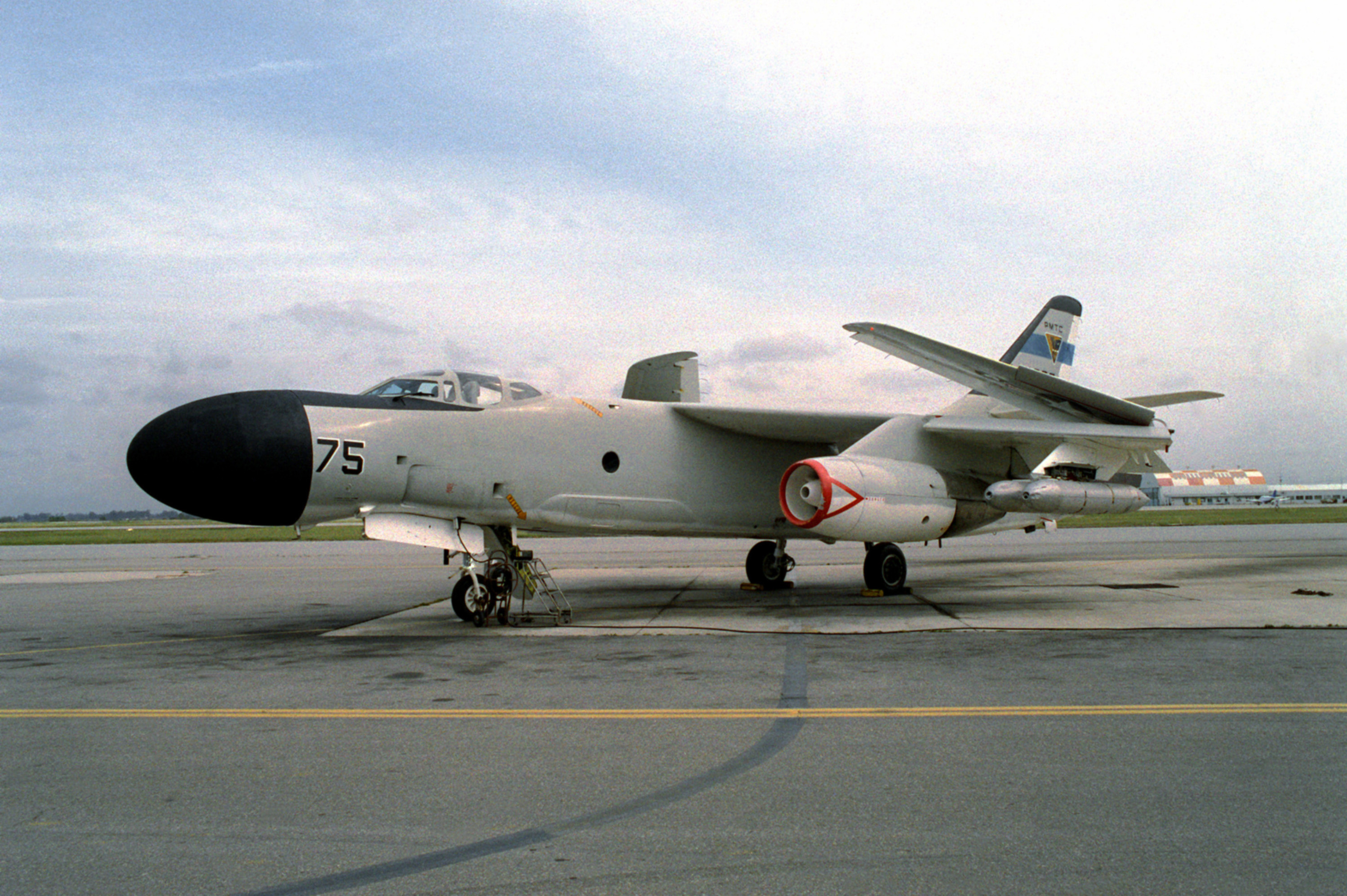
The "Snoopy" A3D, modified for testing of the Eagle

During 1960, a Douglas A3D Skywarrior medium bomber was modified as a testbed for the APQ-81 and was intended to launch AAM-N-10s during the testing phase of the program; the modification, with an enlarged radome, led to the aircraft being nicknamed "Snoopy". However, due to cost issues and concerns about the viability of the slow fleet-defense fighter concept, the Missileer program, including the Eagle, was cancelled in December 1961, before any hardware had been built. Despite the cancellation, however, the design of the Eagle provided data that assisted the development of the AAM-N-11 (later AIM-54) Phoenix missile carried by the General Dynamics–Grumman F-111B and Grumman F-14 Tomcat fighters.
