= W42 (nuclear warhead) =

American nuclear warhead for HAWK missile

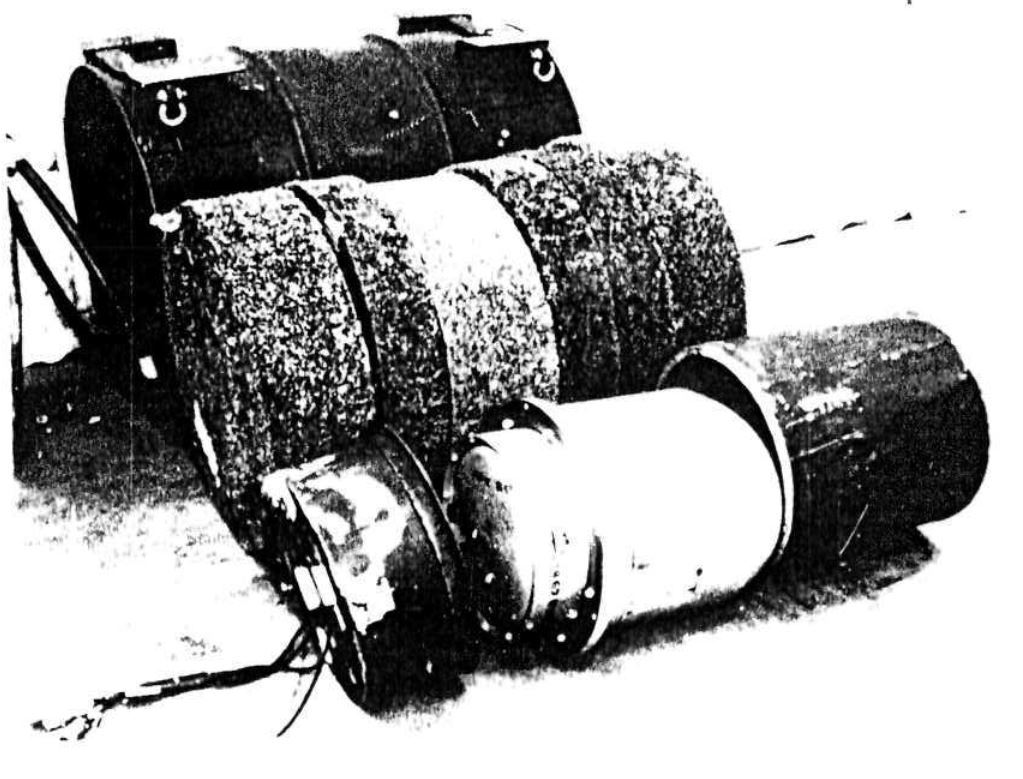
XW42 warhead with its storage container.

The W42 was an American nuclear fission weapon developed in 1957.

In December 1957 the Army requested the Atomic Energy Commission to develop a nuclear warhead for the HAWK low- to medium-altitude surface-to-air missile. In July 1958 the military characteristics were approved for the new warhead and the design released. Two months later the requirement for a HAWK with a nuclear warhead was cancelled.

The warhead was briefly considered for the AAM-N-10 Eagle long-range air-to-air missile

The dimensions of the warhead were 13–14 in (33–36 cm) wide by 18.5 in (47 cm) long. It weighed 75–92 pounds (34–42 kg) and used a proximity fuze.

The project was cancelled in June 1961.
