= AIM-47 Falcon =

American long-range air-to-air missile

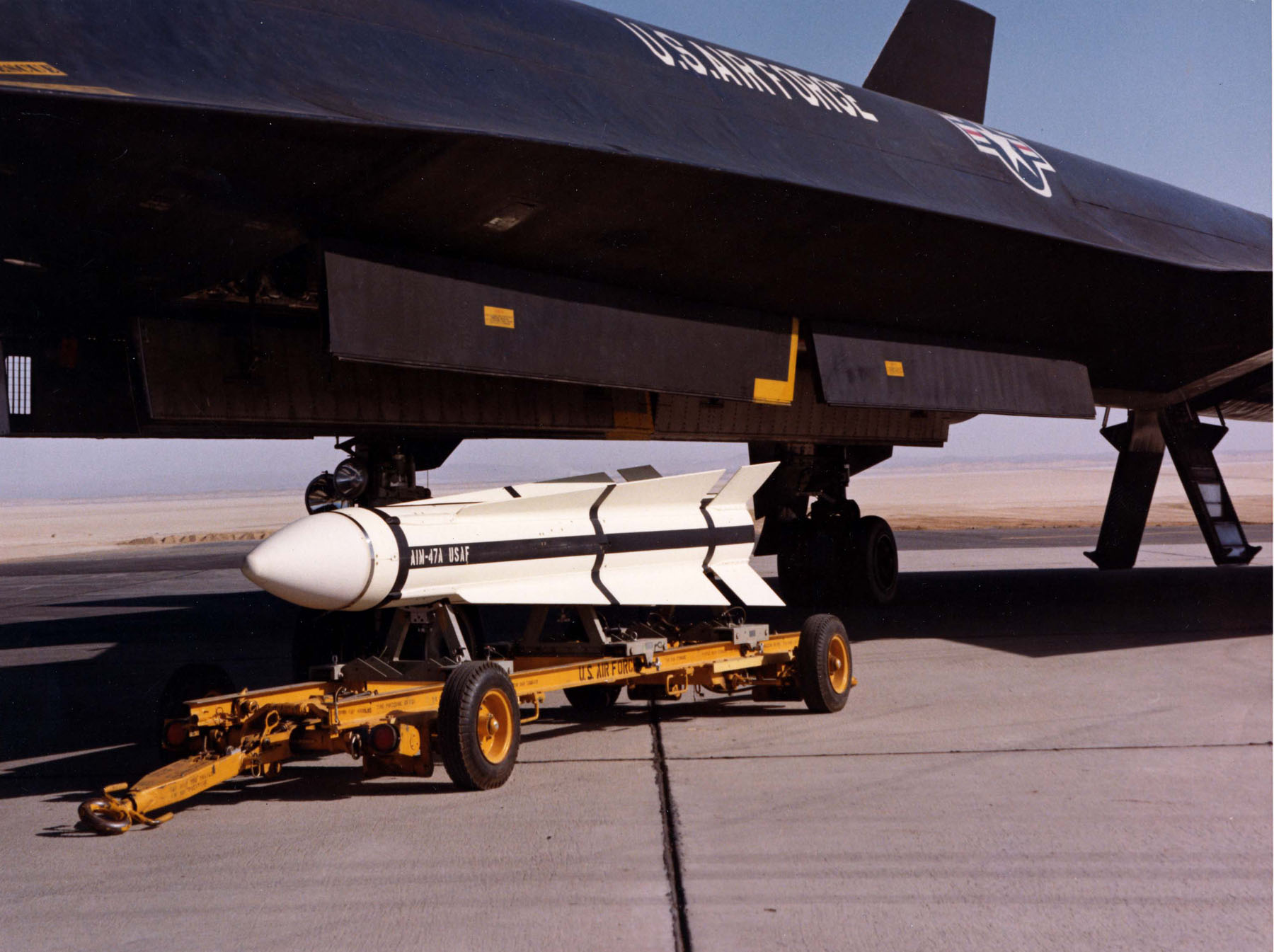
- An AIM-47A waiting to be loaded aboard a YF-12.
- Type: Air-to-air missile
- Place of origin: United States

Service history
- Used by: United States Air Force (testing)

Production history
- Designer: Hughes Aircraft
- Designed: 1957-1966

Specifications (XAIM-47A)
- Mass: 371 kg (818 lb)
- Length: 3.82 m (12 ft 6.5 in)
- Diameter: 343 mm (13.5 in)
- Wingspan: 838 mm (33 in)
- Warhead: 100 lb (45 kg)
- Detonation mechanism: Proximity fuse
- Engine: Lockheed XSR13-LP-1
- Propellant: Solid fuel rocket
- Operational range: 100 mi (87 nmi; 160 km)
- Maximum speed: Mach 4
- Guidance system: Semi-active radar homing, terminal infrared homing
- Launch platform: Lockheed YF-12, North American XF-108 Rapier

The Hughes AIM-47 Falcon, originally GAR-9, was a very long-range high-performance air-to-air missile that shared the basic design of the earlier AIM-4 Falcon. It was developed in 1958 along with the new Hughes AN/ASG-18 radar fire-control system intended to arm the Mach 3 XF-108 Rapier interceptor aircraft and the XB-70, however after those jet's cancellation, the YF-12A (whose production was itself cancelled after only 3 vehicles) was armed with them. It was never used operationally, but was a direct predecessor of the AIM-54 Phoenix used on the Grumman F-14 Tomcat.

== Development ==
=== Development for XF-108 ===
In the early 1950s, the United States Air Force developed requirements for a high speed, high performance interceptor aircraft, originally called the LRI-X. In 1957, Hughes won the contract to supply the weapons system for this aircraft. This system consisted of the GAR-X missile and the YX-1 radar and fire control system. The original missile design had a range of 15 to 25 miles (24 to 40 km), and could be equipped with a conventional warhead or a 0.25 kiloton version of the W42 nuclear warhead. When the North American XF-108 Rapier was announced as the winner of the LRI-X contest in April 1958, the Hughes entries were redesignated GAR-9 and AN/ASG-18 on the same day. The F-108 was canceled in September 1959, but the Air Force decided to continue development of the missile system with both warheads.

During its development, the capabilities of the new missile grew tremendously. Growing much larger, the missile's range was extended to 100 miles (160 km), using the Aerojet-General XM59 solid-fuel motor. The SARH seeker was a powerful system of its own, with the resolution to be able to lock onto a 100-square-foot (9.3 m^{2}) target at 63 nmi (117 km). Some consideration was given to the addition of a passive infrared homing seeker to improve terminal performance but that would have required the missile to grow by 180 lb (82 kg) and two inches in diameter, making it too large for the F-108's weapon bay. The W42 nuclear version was dropped in 1958 in favor of a 100-pound (45 kg) high-explosive design.

Problems with the motor during development led to the brief consideration of using a storable liquid-fuel rocket design, but was replaced instead by the Lockheed XSR13-LP-1 solid rocket. This lowered the top speed from Mach 6 to Mach 4. In this form, the GAR-9 started ground firings in August 1961. For air-launch testing at supersonic speeds the Republic XF-103 had originally been proposed as a test platform, but this aircraft was canceled before reaching the prototype stage. Instead, B-58 Hustler s/n 55-665 was modified to house the AN/ASG-18 radar in a large protruding radome that gave it the nickname "Snoopy", and in-flight launches started in May 1962.

=== Development for YF-12 ===
In 1960 Lockheed started development of the Lockheed YF-12 interceptor, as a lower-cost replacement for the F-108. The GAR-9/ASG-18 were moved to this project. The F-12 would have featured four flip-open internal weapons bays on the chines behind the cockpit, one of these filled with electronics. The F-12B bays were too small for the GAR-9, so the GAR-9B was developed with flip-out fins to reduce its diameter. It weighed 805 pounds (365 kg).

Test firings of the GAR-9A from the prototype F-12As resulted in six kills from seven launches, the lone miss due to a missile power failure (there were several non-guiding test launches as well). The missile was renamed AIM-47 in late 1962 as part of the transition to common naming for aerospace vehicles across the U.S. Department of Defense in 1962. The last launch was from a YF-12 flying at Mach 3.2 and an altitude of 74,400 feet (22,700 m) at a QB-47 target drone 500 feet (150 m) off the ground.

In 1966, the F-12 project was canceled just as the F-108 had been. Another project which expressed an interest in the design was the XB-70 Valkyrie, a bomber which could have carried the AIM-47 for self-defense. This aircraft was also canceled after Soviet deployment of effective high-altitude surface-to-air missiles made high-altitude attacks on the Soviet Union impractical.

Hughes had built 80 pre-production AIM-47 missiles.

== Legacy ==
The AIM-47 was used as a base for the AIM-54 Phoenix (originally the AAM-N-11), intended for the General Dynamics F-111B. This project was also canceled in 1968, but the weapon system finally found a home on the F-14 Tomcat, entering service in the early 1970s.

In 1966, the basic airframe was adapted with the seeker from the AGM-45 Shrike and the 250 lb (110 kg) warhead from the Mk 81 bomb to create the high-speed AGM-76 Falcon anti-radar missile, although this did not see service.

== See also ==
- Missile designation
