= AN/ASG-18 =

Prototype fire control radar system

The AN/ASG-18 Fire Control System produced by Hughes Aircraft was a prototype airborne fire control radar system for the planned North American XF-108 Rapier interceptor aircraft, and the Lockheed YF-12 for the United States Air Force. It was the US's first Pulse-Doppler radar, giving it look-down/shoot-down capability, and was also the first track while scan radar (could track more than one target at a time). This was paired with an infrared search and track (IRST) system. Range of the radar was estimated at between 200–300 mi (320–480 km), with reliable detection of bomber-sized targets at 100 miles (160 km). The installation itself was massive, weighing 2,100 pounds (950 kg), and taking up most of the nose of the aircraft. The system was to be used with the Hughes AIM-47 Falcon missile, which also had a range of about 100 miles.

While development work was done with the XF-108, the AN/ASG-18 and Falcon missiles were first tested on a highly modified Convair B-58 Hustler bomber. To fit the radar, the nose was lengthened nearly 7 feet (2.1 m), and the infrared sensors were mounted on either side of the forward fuselage. The resulting nose shape led to it being nicknamed "Snoopy". A single missile was housed in a specially built pod underneath the fuselage.

Before the test "Snoopy" could fly, the XF-108 program was cancelled, and the proposed Lockheed YF-12 interceptor was to instead receive the radar/missile system pair. Tests of the system were conducted first in 1960 and until 1963 only on the modified B-58, after which the YF-12 took over until the cancellation of the whole program in 1966.. While the YF-12 was cancelled, the Navy had a requirement for an interceptor that demanded a radar and missiles with similar performance, and Hughes would adapt the ASG-18 into the AN/AWG-9.

In accordance with the Joint Electronics Type Designation System (JETDS), the "AN/ASG-18" designation represents the 18th design of an Army-Navy airborne electronic device for special fire control equipment. The JETDS system also now is used to name all Department of Defense electronic systems.

== See also ==
- List of military electronics of the United States
