= Lockheed YF-12 =

American prototype interceptor aircraft

YF-12
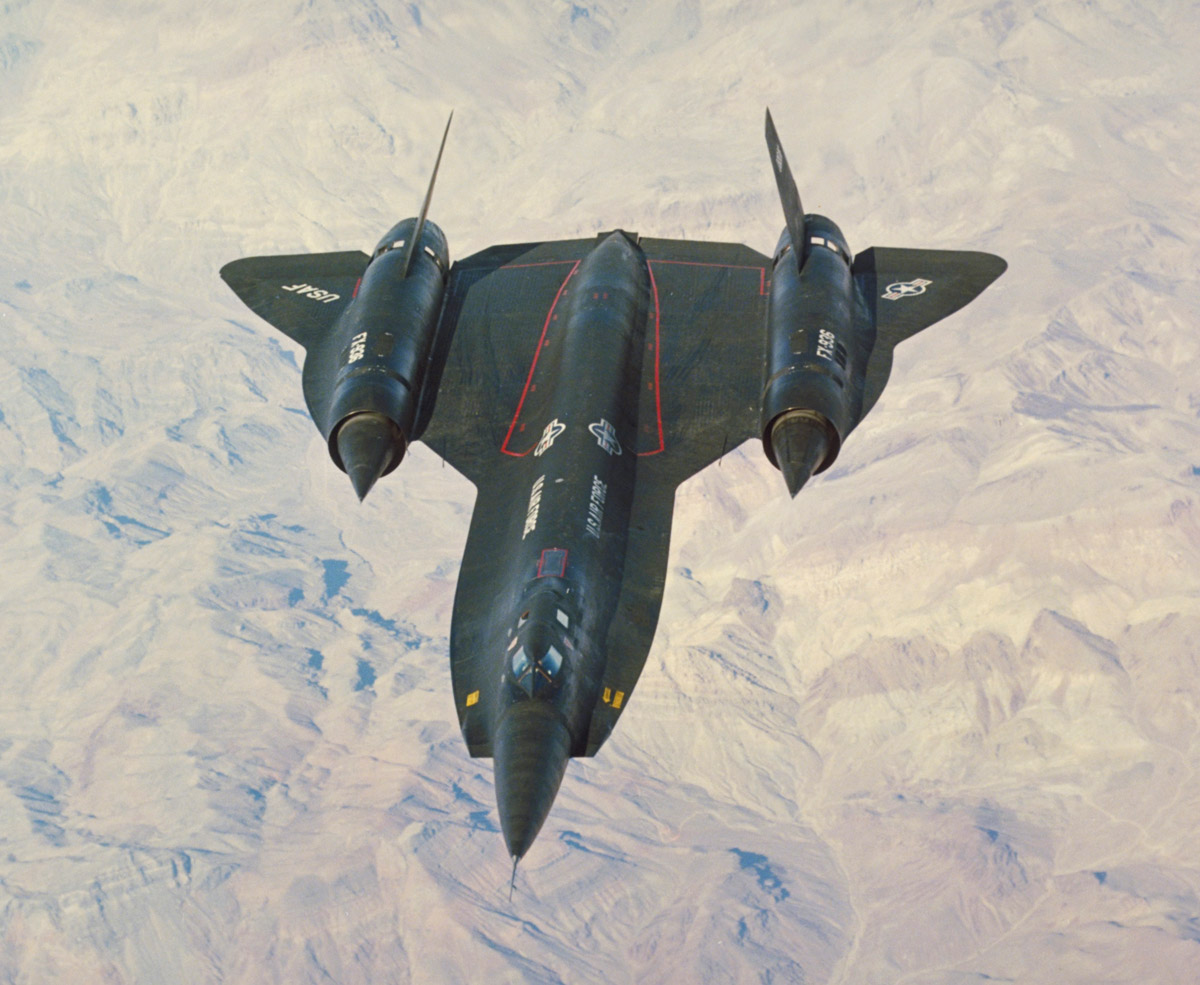
- YF-12A

General information
- Type: Interceptor aircraft
- Manufacturer: Lockheed Corporation
- Status: Canceled
- Primary users: United States Air Force NASA
- Number built: 3

History
- First flight: 7 August 1963
- Developed from: Lockheed A-12

The Lockheed YF-12 is an American Mach 3+ capable, high-altitude interceptor prototype, developed and manufactured by American aerospace company Lockheed Corporation.

The interceptor was developed during the late 1950s and early 1960s as a potential replacement for the F-106 Delta Dart interceptor for the United States Air Force (USAF). The YF-12 was a twin-seat version of the then-secret single-seat Lockheed A-12 reconnaissance aircraft operated by the Central Intelligence Agency (CIA); unlike the A-12, it was furnished with the Hughes AN/ASG-18 fire-control radar and could be armed with AIM-47 Falcon (GAR-9) air-to-air missiles. Its maiden flight was on 7 August 1963. Its existence was publicly revealed by President Lyndon B. Johnson on 24 February 1964; this move was to provide plausible deniability for the CIA-operated A-12 fleet, which closely resembled the prototype YF-12.

During the 1960s, the Air Force flight tested the YF-12 but lacked funding to put it into operational use due to the Vietnam War and other military priorities. The world's largest, heaviest and fastest crewed interceptor, it set speed and altitude world records of over 2,000 miles per hour (3,200 km/h) and over 80,000 feet (24,000 m), which were later surpassed by the closely related SR-71 Blackbird. After its retirement by the USAF, NASA used it as a research aircraft, leading to several improvements in control for supersonic flight.

== Design and development ==
In the late 1950s, the United States Air Force sought a replacement for its F-106 Delta Dart interceptor. As part of the Long Range Interceptor Experimental (LRI-X) program, the North American XF-108 Rapier, an interceptor with Mach 3 speed, was selected. However, the F-108 program was canceled by the Department of Defense in September 1959. During this time, Lockheed's Skunk Works was developing the A-12 reconnaissance aircraft for the U.S. Central Intelligence Agency (CIA) under the Oxcart program. Kelly Johnson, the head of Skunk Works, proposed to build a version of the A-12 named AF-12 by the company; the USAF ordered three AF-12s in mid-1960.

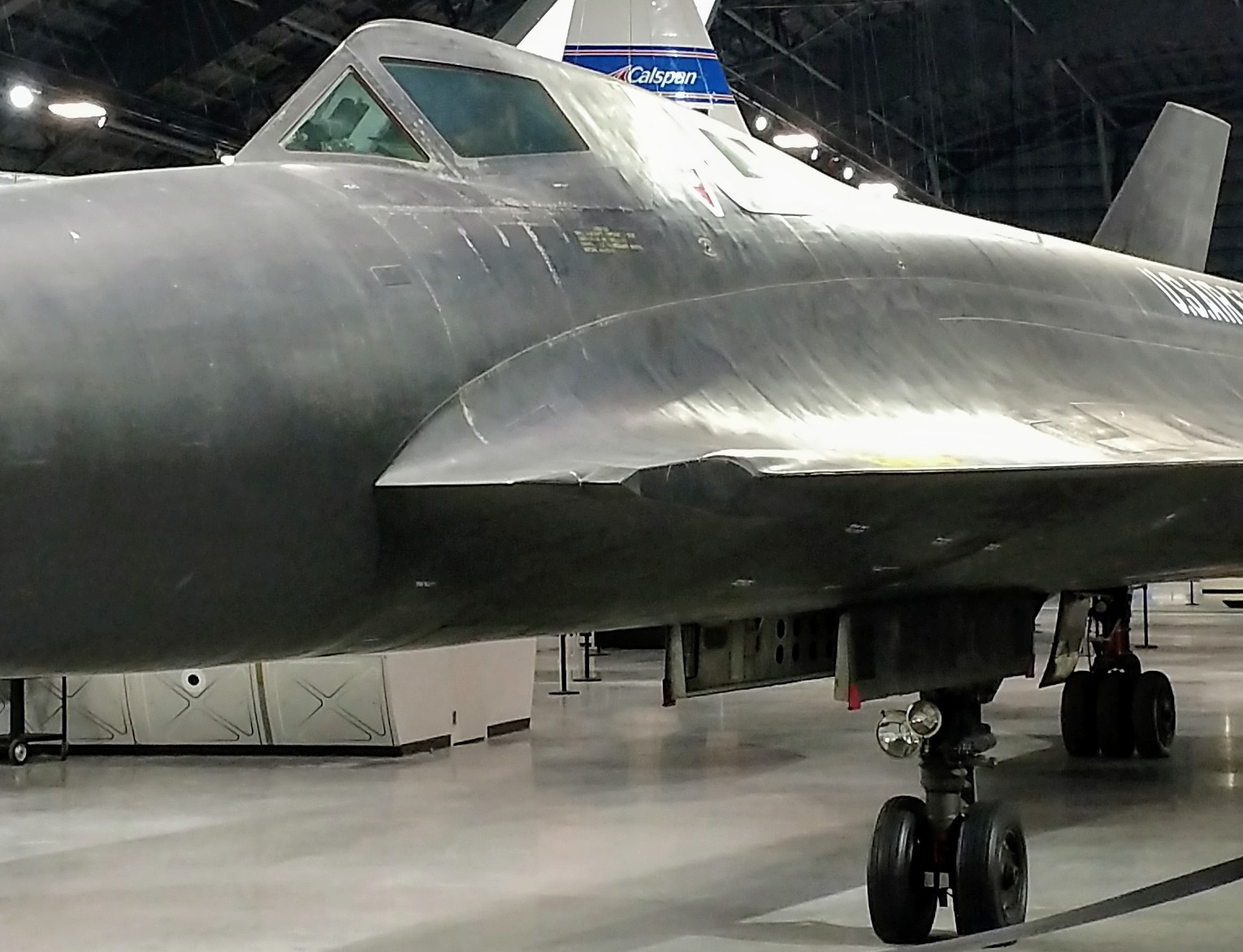
Picture of the modified chine to accommodate the AN/ASG-18 radar

The AF-12s took the seventh through ninth slots on the A-12 assembly line; these were designated as YF-12A interceptors. The main changes involved modifying the A-12's nose by cutting back the chines to accommodate the huge Hughes AN/ASG-18 fire-control radar originally developed for the XF-108 with two infrared search and track sensors located in the chine leading edge, and the addition of the second cockpit for a crew member to operate the fire control radar for the air-to-air missile system. The modifications changed the aircraft's aerodynamics enough to require ventral fins to be mounted under the fuselage and engine nacelles to maintain stability. Three of the four bays previously used to house the A-12's reconnaissance equipment were converted to carry Hughes AIM-47 Falcon (GAR-9) missiles. One bay was used for fire control equipment.

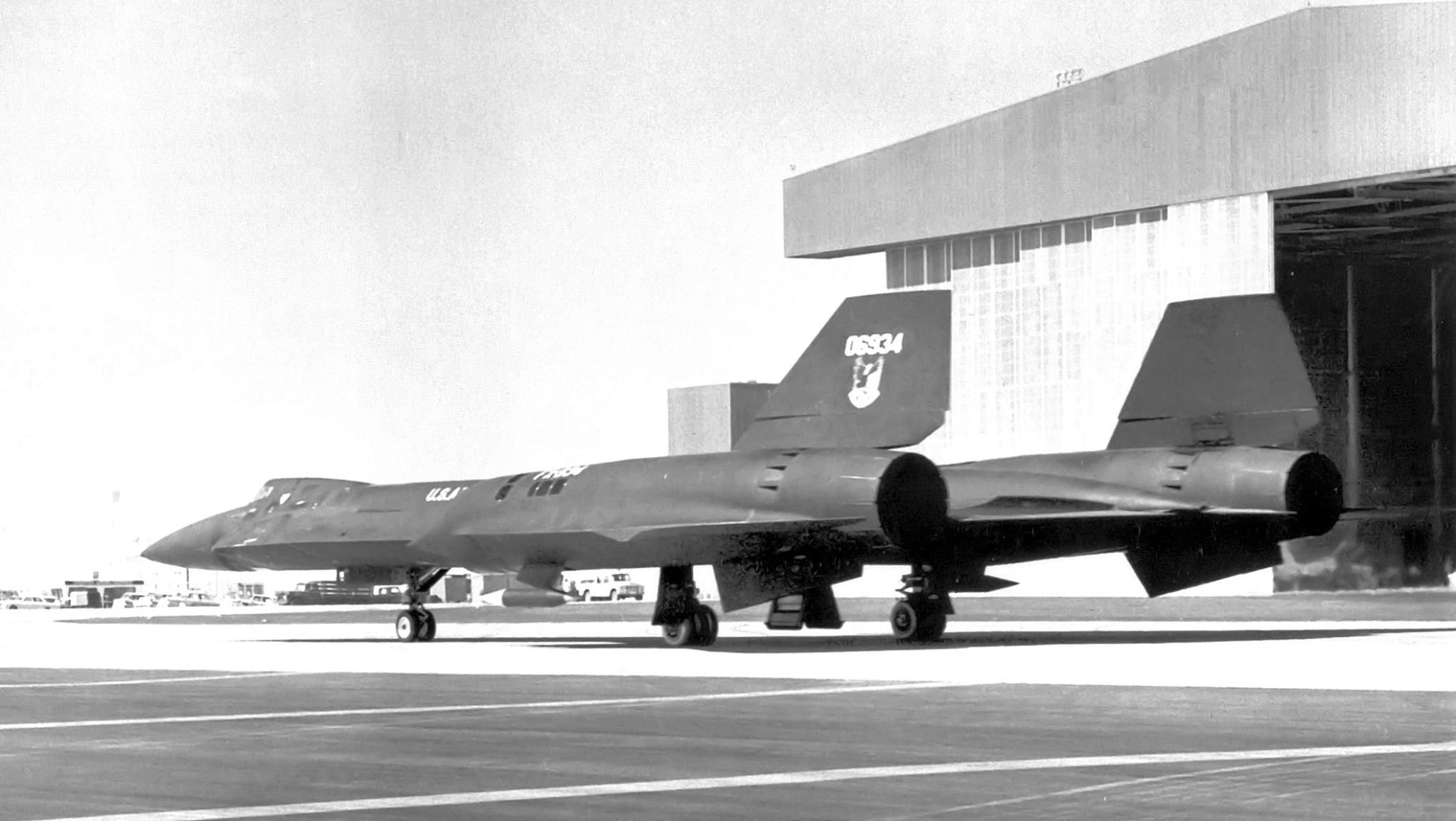
Lockheed YF-12A, Serial# 60-6934, the only YF-12A in ADC markings

The first YF-12A flew on 7 August 1963. President Lyndon B. Johnson announced the existence of the aircraft (Note: Johnson's speech named the plane A-11, the name for the two-seat design.) on 24 February 1964. The YF-12A was announced in part to continue hiding the A-12, its still-secret ancestor; any sightings of CIA/Air Force A-12s based at Area 51 in Nevada could be attributed to the well-publicized Air Force YF-12As based at Edwards Air Force Base in California. The first public showing of the aircraft was on 30 September 1964 at Edwards.

On 14 May 1965, the Air Force placed a production order for 93 F-12Bs for its Air Defense Command (ADC). However, Secretary of Defense Robert McNamara would not release the funding for three consecutive years due to Vietnam War costs. Updated intelligence placed a lower priority on defense of the continental US, so the F-12B was deemed no longer needed. Then in January 1968, the F-12B program was officially ended.

== Operational history ==
=== Air Force testing ===
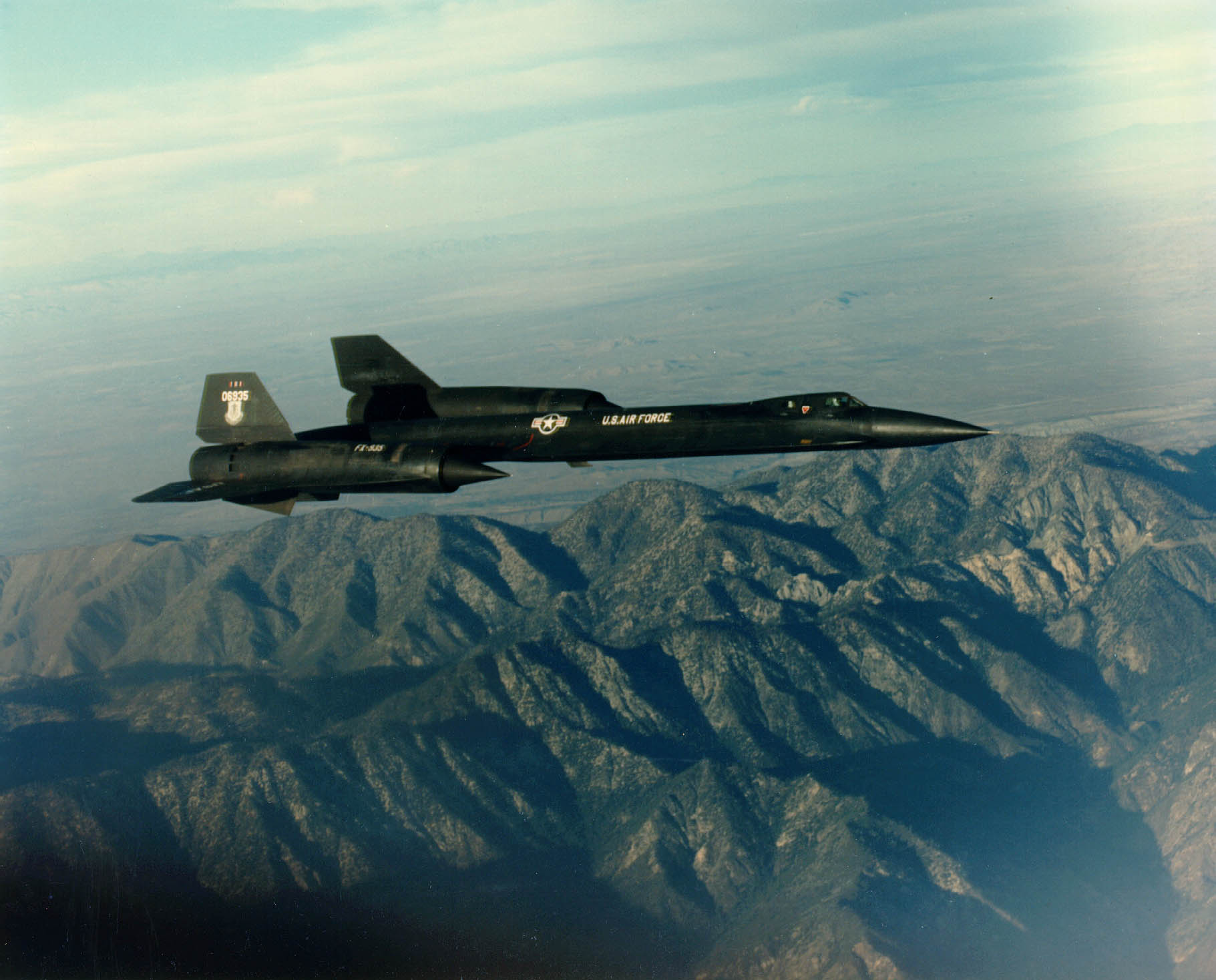
YF-12A over mountainous terrain.

During flight tests the YF-12As set a speed record of 2,070.101 miles per hour (3,331.505 km/h) and altitude record of 80,257.86 feet (24,462.60 m), both on 1 May 1965, and demonstrated promising results with its unique weapon system. Six successful firings of the AIM-47 missiles were completed, and a seventh failed due to a gyro failure on one of the missiles. The last one was launched from the YF-12 at Mach 3.2 at an altitude of 74,000 feet (23,000 m) to a JQB-47E target drone 500 feet (150 m) off the ground. The missile did not have a warhead but still managed to hit the B-47 directly and take a 4-foot (120 cm) section off its tail. The Air Force considered it a success and ordered 96 aircraft and had an initial budget of $90 million to further testing, but this was withheld by Secretary of Defense McNamara, who on 23 November 1967 put it towards the much less successful F-106X program that nearly failed.

The successful AIM-47 Falcon missile was increased in size and performance and became the AIM-54 Phoenix missile for the F-14 Tomcat. The AN/ASG 18 radar was upgraded to become the AN/AWG-9 and APG-71, which added the ability to track multiple targets.

One of the Air Force test pilots, Jim Irwin, would go on to become a NASA astronaut and walk on the Moon.

The program was abandoned following the cancellation of the production F-12B, but the YF-12s continued flying for many years with the USAF and with NASA as research aircraft.

=== NASA testing ===
NASA Overview of the YF-12, circa 1974 (26:38)

The initial phase of the test program included objectives aimed at answering some questions about implementation of the B-1. Air Force objectives included exploration of its use in a tactical environment, and how airborne early warning and control (AEW&C) would control supersonic aircraft. The Air Force portion was budgeted at US$4 million. The NASA tests would answer questions such as how engine inlet performance affected airframe and propulsion interaction, boundary layer noise, heat transfer under high Mach conditions, and altitude hold at supersonic speeds. The NASA budget for the 2.5-year program was US$14 million (~$38.4 million in 2024).

The YF-12 and SR-71 originally suffered from severe control issues that affected both the engines and the physical control of the aircraft. Wind testing at NASA Dryden and YF-12 research flights developed computer systems that nearly completely solved the performance issues. Testing revealed vortices from the nose chines interfering with intake air, which led to the development of a computer control system to open the forward bypass doors. A computer system to reduce unstarts was also developed. They also developed a flight engineering computer program called Central Airborne Performance Analyzer (CAPA) that relayed engine data to the pilots and informed them of any faults or issues with performance and indicated the severity of malfunctions.

Another system called Cooperative Airframe-Propulsion Control System (CAPCS) greatly improved the control of supersonic aircraft in flight. At such high speeds even minor changes in direction caused the aircraft to change position by thousands of feet, and often had severe temperature and pressure changes. CAPCS reduced these deviations by a factor of 10. The overall improvements increased range of the SR-71 by 7 percent.

Of the three YF-12As, AF Ser. No. 60-6934 was damaged beyond repair by fire at Edwards AFB during a landing mishap on 14 August 1966; its rear half was salvaged and combined with the front half of a Lockheed static test airframe to create the only SR-71C.

YF-12A, AF Ser. No. 60-6936 was lost on 24 June 1971 due to an in-flight fire caused by a failed fuel line; both pilots ejected safely just north of Edwards AFB. YF-12A, AF Ser. No. 60-6935 is the only surviving YF-12A; it was recalled from storage in 1969 for a joint USAF/NASA investigation of supersonic cruise technology, and then flown to the National Museum of the United States Air Force at Wright-Patterson Air Force Base near Dayton, Ohio on 17 November 1979.

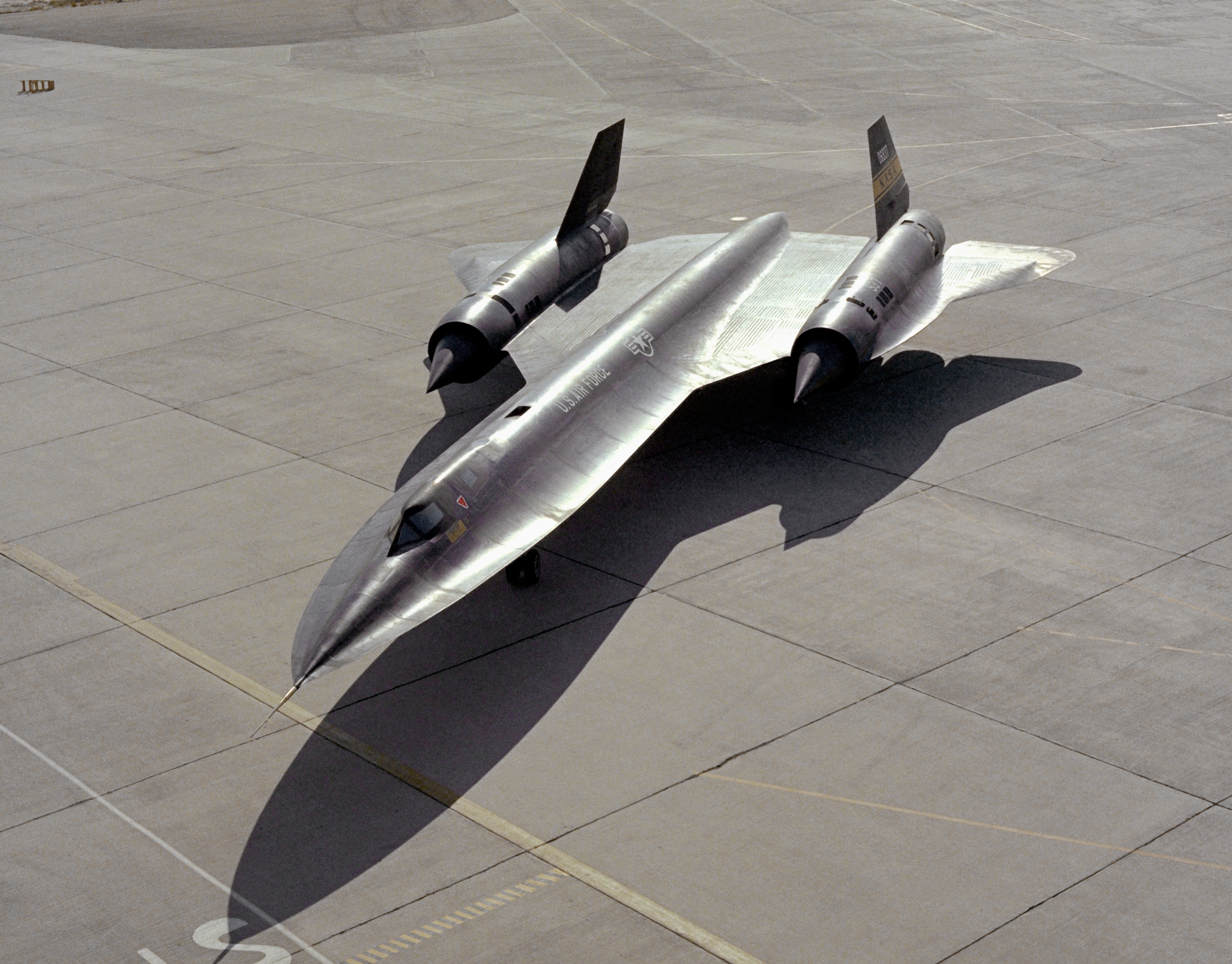
YF-12C on ramp

A fourth YF-12 aircraft, the "YF-12C", was actually the second SR-71A (AF Ser. No. 61–7951). This SR-71A was re-designated as a YF-12C and given the fictitious Air Force Serial Number 60-6937 from an A-12 to maintain SR-71 secrecy. The aircraft was loaned to NASA for propulsion testing after the loss of YF-12A (AF Ser. No. 60–6936) in 1971. The YF-12C was operated by NASA until September 1978, when it was returned to the Air Force.

The YF-12 had a real-field sonic-boom overpressure value between 33.5 and 52.7 N/m^{2} (0.7 to 1.1 lb/ft^{2}) – below 48 was considered "low".

== Variants ==
YF-12A
Pre-production version. Three were built.
F-12B
Production version of the YF-12A with various improvements such as an increased combat radius from 1,200 to 1,350 nautical miles and an improved fire control system with increased bomber detection range from 100 to 125 miles; canceled before production could begin.
YF-12C
Fictitious designation for an SR-71 provided to NASA for flight testing. The YF-12 designation was used to keep SR-71 information out of the public domain. From 1971 to 1978, 61-7951 was temporarily loaned to NASA from the Air Force as "YF-12C #06937".

== Operators ==
United States

- United States Air Force
- NASA

== Accidents and incidents ==
- 24 July 1971 YF-12A 60-6936 (Article 1003) was lost in an accident near Edwards Air Force Base, California, US.

== Aircraft on display ==
YF-12A AF Ser. No. 60-6935 in the National Museum of the USAF

YF-12A

- YF-12A, AF Ser. No. 60-6935 (Article 1002) – at the National Museum of the U.S. Air Force, Wright-Patterson AFB, Dayton, Ohio. This aircraft has small patches in its skin, on the starboard side below the cockpit. The patches cover holes caused by the "spurs" of a crewman who had to evacuate the plane after an emergency landing.
- SR-71C, AF Ser. No. 61-7981 (portion of the former YF-12A AF Ser. No. 60-6934) is on display at the Hill Aerospace Museum, Hill AFB, Utah.

== Specifications (YF-12A) ==
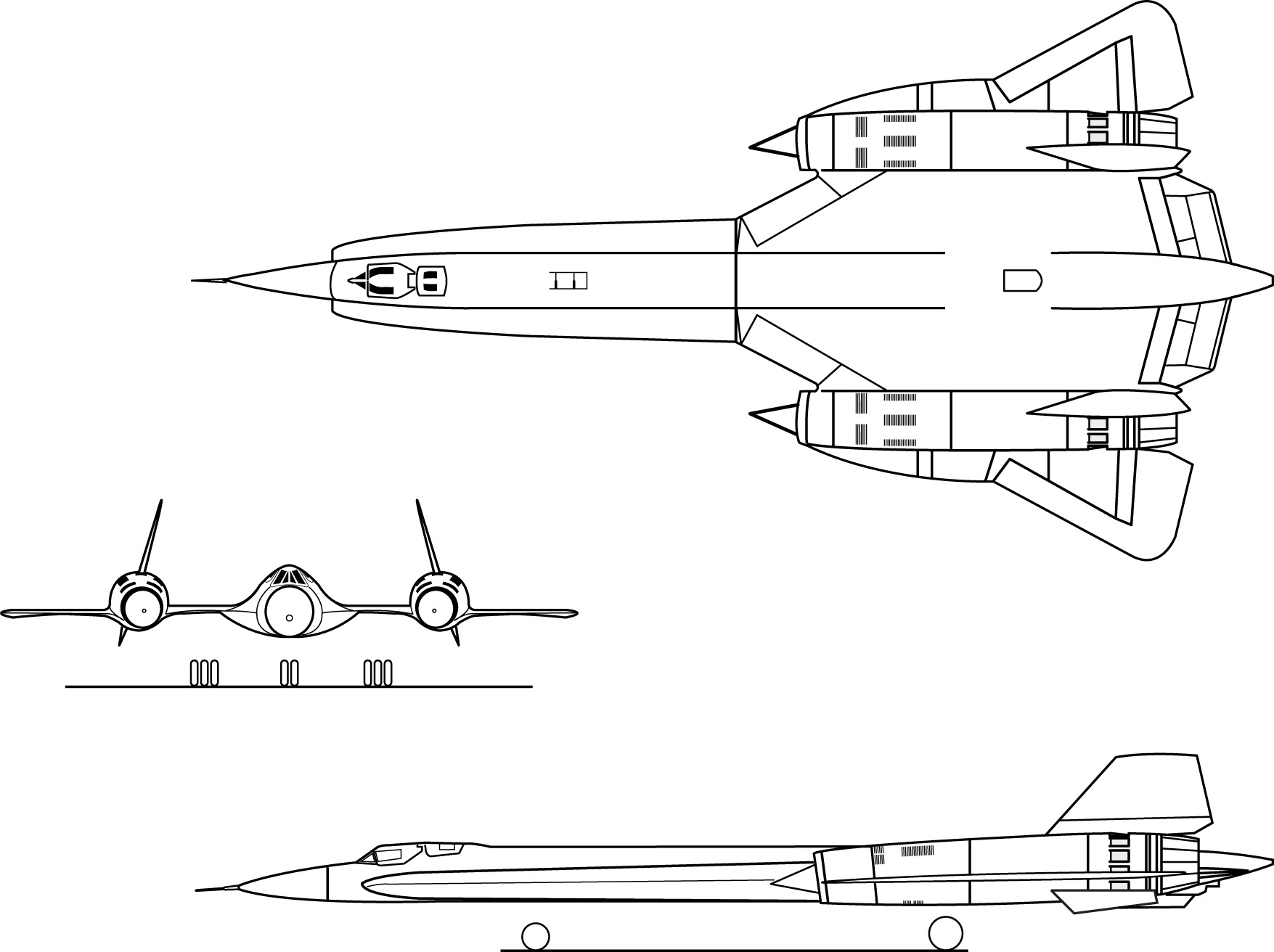
Orthographically projected diagram of the Lockheed YF-12

Data from Lockheed's SR-71 'Blackbird' Family

General characteristics

- Crew: 2; pilot and fire control officer (FCO)
- Length: 101 ft 8 in (30.97 m)
- Wingspan: 55 ft 7 in (16.95 m)
- Height: 18 ft 6 in (5.64 m)
- Wing area: 1,795 sq ft (167 m^{2})
- Aspect ratio: 1.7
- Empty weight: 60,730 lb (27,604 kg)
- Gross weight: 124,000 lb (56,200 kg)
- Max takeoff weight: 140,000 lb (63,504 kg)
- Powerplant: 2 × Pratt & Whitney J58 (JTD11D-20A) afterburning turbojet with compressor bleed bypass, 20,500 lbf (91 kN) thrust each dry, 31,500 lbf (140 kN) with afterburner

Performance

- Maximum speed: 2,275 mph (3,661 km/h, 1,977 kn) at 80,000 ft (24,000 m)
- Maximum speed: Mach 3.35
- Combat range: 3,000 mi (4,800 km, 2,600 nmi)
- Service ceiling: 90,000 ft (27,400 m)
- Rate of climb: 11,820 ft/min (60 m/s)
- Thrust/weight: 0.44

Armament

- Missiles: 3× Hughes AIM-47A air-to-air missiles located internally in fuselage bays

Avionics

- Hughes AN/ASG-18 look-down/shoot-down fire control radar

== See also ==
Related development

- Lockheed A-12
- M-21 drone carrier
- Lockheed SR-71 Blackbird

Related lists

- List of military aircraft of the United States
- List of Lockheed aircraft
- List of fighter aircraft
