= North American XF-108 Rapier =

Canceled interceptor aircraft project

XF-108 Rapier
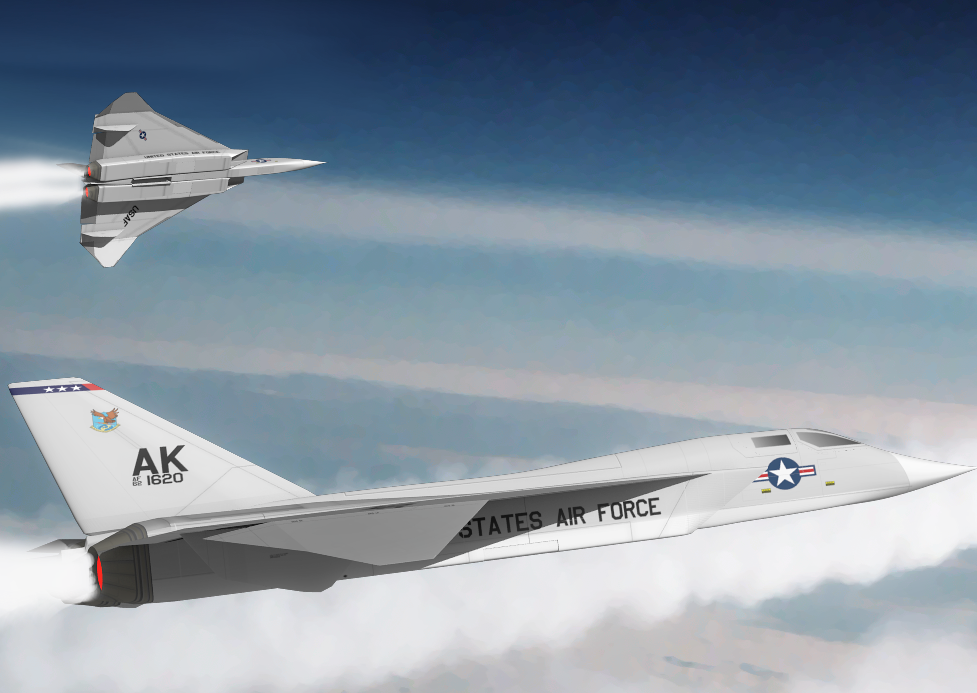
- Artist's impression of two F-108s attached to Elmendorf AFB, Alaska. Note: Top aircraft's weapons bay opening.

General information
- Type: Interceptor aircraft
- National origin: United States
- Manufacturer: North American Aviation
- Status: Canceled (1959)
- Primary user: United States Air Force (intended)
- Number built: None

The North American XF-108 Rapier was a proposed long-range, high-speed interceptor aircraft designed by North American Aviation intended to defend the United States from supersonic Soviet strategic bombers. The aircraft would have cruised at speeds around Mach 3 (3,200 km/h; 2,000 mph) with an unrefueled combat radius over 1,000 nautical miles (1,900 km; 1,200 mi), and was equipped with radar and missiles offering engagement ranges up to 100 miles (160 km) against bomber-sized targets.

To limit development costs, the program shared engine development with the North American XB-70 Valkyrie strategic bomber program, and used a number of elements of earlier interceptor projects. The program had progressed only as far as the construction of a single wooden mockup when it was canceled in 1959, due to a shortage of funds and the Soviets' adoption of ballistic missiles as their primary means of nuclear deterrence. Had it flown, the F-108 would have been the heaviest fighter of its era. Some design elements were used in the North American A-5 Vigilante.

Prior to the project's cancellation, U.S. President Dwight D. Eisenhower noted that raising the F-108 interceptor force would have cost the U.S. taxpayer $4 billion (equivalent to $44 billion today).

== Development ==
=== LRI-X ===
During the early 1950s, the USAF proposed a very high-performance, long-range interceptor. On 20 July 1955, formal development of what became known as the Long-Range Interceptor, Experimental (LRI-X) was approved, planned as an F-102 Delta Dagger/F-106 Delta Dart replacement. The specification was laid down on 6 October 1955, calling for an interceptor that could fly at 60,000 ft (18,000 m) at a speed of Mach 1.7 (1,122 mph (1,806 km/h), with a range of 1,000 miles (1,600 km). It was to have a two-man crew and at least two engines. A further consideration was that an integrated fire-control system would be fitted, allowing the interception of a bomber at 60 nmi (110 km) and three targets to be destroyed during a single mission.

Of the eight interested companies, contracts for preliminary studies were issued to North American Aviation, Lockheed and Northrop on 11 October 1955, five days after the specification's release. Of the paper designs, the North American proposal, dubbed "NA-236", seemed the most promising. The NA-236 shared some similarities with the XF-108, although the most obvious differences were the additions of two finlets at the midspan of the horizontal stabilizers, and canards. Political and budgetary difficulties led to the cancellation of the program on 9 May 1956.

=== WS-202A ===
After considerable confusion, the program was reinstated on 11 April 1957 with North American awarded a contract for two prototypes. The designation F-108 was issued, also known as "Weapon System 202A" (WS-202A). North American's company designation was "NA-257", although it was basically identical to the NA-236. At the time, Air Defense Command anticipated an order for 480 aircraft.

The resulting design went through considerable evolution, owing to both its cutting-edge technology and continual redefinition of the USAF requirements. Early revisions prominently featured canards, with a span of 19 feet 10 inches (6.05 m), and a wing of 53.5° sweep. The aircraft in this configuration would have had a maximum takeoff weight of 99,400 pounds (45,100 kg) with a 72,550-foot (22,110 m) operational ceiling. In addition to the F-108's interceptor role, North American proposed it as a penetration fighter to aid its own B-70 Valkyrie supersonic bomber prototype. Commonality between the B-70 bomber and the F-108 included the escape capsule and General Electric YJ93 engines. Another role considered was for the F-108 to be "gap-fillers" for the Distant Early Warning (DEW) system; because of its great speed, the F-108 could have scanned up to 278,000 square miles (720,000 km^{2}) per hour.

From September 1958, substantial engineering and design changes were implemented; however, SAC had lost interest in the escort fighter concept. To accompany the B-70 all the way to its target and back, the F-108 in its initial concept would have, at best, marginal range. On 30 December 1958, YF-108A preproduction aircraft on order were reduced from 31 to 20 test aircraft and the first test flight was delayed from February to April 1961. The eventual design, which was built as a full-sized XF-108 mockup, was displayed to Air Force officials on 17–20 January 1959. The project was given the name "Rapier" on 15 May 1959, following a contest by the Air Defense Command asking airmen for suggestions.

=== Cancellation ===
Even as the XF-108 program was progressing well, there were signs that would ultimately lead to its eventual cancellation. Unconfirmed Soviet bomber threats, the overwhelming trend toward offensive and defensive nuclear missiles in the late 1950s and early 1960s, as well as rising costs, contributed to the termination of the XF-108. The cancellation was announced on 23 September 1959. North American continued refining the design through 1960 in hopes that the program might be revived. Despite the extra money and time spent on the Rapier, it was not wholly in vain; the North American A-5 Vigilante supersonic carrier-based nuclear strike bomber developed for the U.S. Navy, which was later modified into a carrier-based reconnaissance aircraft, retained the fuselage/weapon package and systems design of the Rapier. In many ways the Vigilante could be seen as the successful scaled-down application of the Rapier design principles in a Mach 2 supersonic design.

Hughes Aircraft would continue the development of the advanced fire control system and the GAR-9 missile. (Note: Quote: "The Pentagon did, however, continue development of the ASG-18 fire-control system and GAR-9 missile.) Development of the F-108 radar and missiles was continued by the USAF and the system was eventually used in the Lockheed YF-12 program. The final configuration for the rear cockpit in the YF-12A looked similar to that of the F-108 since it incorporated the same displays and controls required for the Hughes AN/ASG-18 fire control system.

== Design ==
The initial F-108 configuration featured a very large "cranked" delta wing. There were fixed ventral stabilizers on the wings, mounted at mid-span, and a tall all-moving vertical tailfin, supplemented by two ventral stabilizers that extended when the landing gear retracted. Although some earlier versions of the design had separate tailplanes or forward canards, both were abandoned in the final design. The large fuselage and wing had two and five fuel tanks, respectively, giving an estimated combat radius of some 1,100 nautical miles (2,000 km). Top speed was estimated at 1,980 miles per hour (3,190 km/h), about Mach 3, at 81,800 feet (24,900 m). The aircraft was powered by two General Electric J93 turbojet engines, also used in North American's XB-70 Valkyrie bomber, in the fuselage.

The F-108 was intended to carry the Hughes AN/ASG-18 radar, the U.S.'s first pulse-Doppler radar set. It was to have look-down/shoot-down capability, but could track only one target at a time. The radar was paired with an infra-red search and tracking (IRST) system on the wing leading edges. The radar was used to guide the Hughes GAR-9 (later redesignated AIM-47) air-to-air missile, three of which would be carried on a rotary launcher in an internal weapons bay. The GAR-9 was a very large, long-range weapon with its own radar set for terminal homing. It was intended to fly at Mach 6, with a range of almost 112 miles (180 km).

== XQ-11 target drone ==
As part of WS-202A, a design for a high-speed (Mach 3+) aerial target for use in testing the F-108's weapons system was proposed. The Wright Air Development Center requested the designation XQ-11 for the target design; the request was denied due to the early stage of development, and the F-108 program was cancelled before further work was undertaken.

== Specifications (XF-108) ==
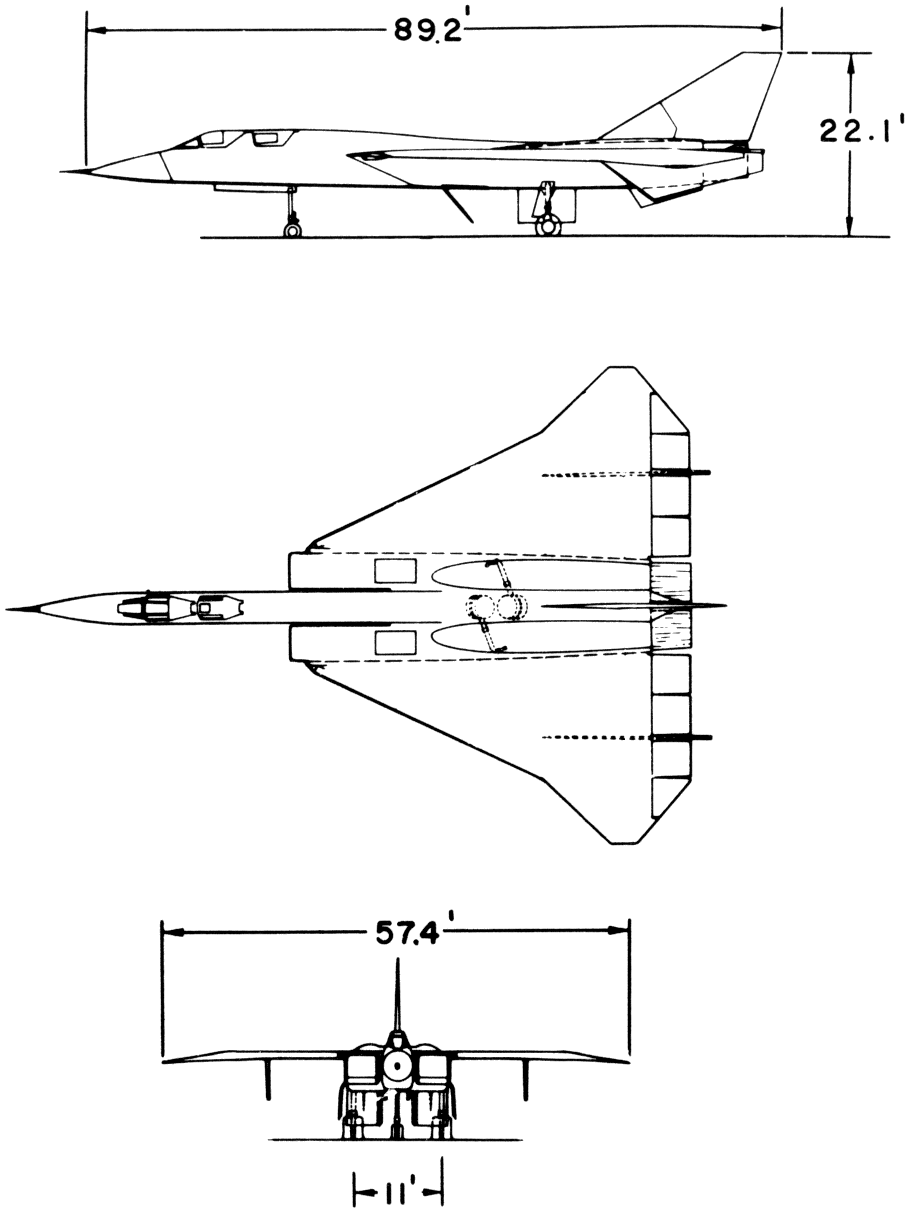
3-view line drawing of the North American F-108A Rapier

Data from National Museum of the United States Air Force and U.S. Standard Aircraft Characteristics

General characteristics

- Crew: two
- Length: 89 ft 2 in (27.2 m)
- Wingspan: 57 ft 5 in (17.5 m)
- Height: 22 ft 1 in (6.7 m)
- Wing area: 1,865 sq ft (173.4 m^{2})
- Aspect ratio: 1.68
- Empty weight: 50,907 lb (23,098 kg)
- Gross weight: 76,118 lb (34,527 kg)
- Max takeoff weight: 102,533 lb (46,508 kg)
- Powerplant: 2 × General Electric J93-GE-3AR afterburning turbojet, 20,900 lbf (93 kN) thrust each dry, 29,300 lbf (130 kN) with afterburner

Performance

- Maximum speed: 1,980 mph (3,190 km/h, 1,721 kn) at altitude
- Maximum speed: Mach 3
- Stall speed: 105 mph (169 km/h, 91 kn)
- Combat range: 1,162 mi (1,870 km, 1,010 nmi)
- Ferry range: 2,487 mi (4,002 km, 2,161 nmi)
- Service ceiling: 80,100 ft (24,400 m)
- Rate of climb: 45,000 ft/min (230 m/s)
- Wing loading: 40.8 lb/sq ft (199.2 kg/m^{2})
- Thrust/weight: 0.77

Armament

- Missiles: 3 × Hughes GAR-9A air-to-air missiles in a rotary weapons bay

Avionics

- Hughes AN/ASG-18 look-down/shoot-down fire control radar

== See also ==
Related development

- North American A-5 Vigilante
- North American XB-70 Valkyrie

Aircraft of comparable role, configuration, and era

- Avro Canada CF-105 Arrow
- Lockheed YF-12
- Mikoyan-Gurevich MiG-25
- Nord 1500 Griffon
- Operational Requirement F.155, British interceptor project
- Republic XF-103
- Tupolev Tu-28

Related lists

- List of military aircraft of the United States
