= Klein Heidelberg =

Passive radar system deployed by the Germans during World War II

- Country of origin: Germany
- Introduced: during the World War II
- Type: bistatic hitchhiker system
- Other names: KH

Klein Heidelberg (KH) was a passive radar system deployed by the Germans during World War II. It used the signals broadcast by the British Chain Home system as its transmitter, and a series of six stations along the western coast of continental Europe as passive receivers. In modern terminology, the system was a bistatic radar. Because the system sent no signals of its own, the allies were unaware of its presence, and did not learn of the system until well after the D-Day invasion. The system is referred to as Klein Heidelberg Parasit (Small Heidelberg Parasite) in some references.

== History ==
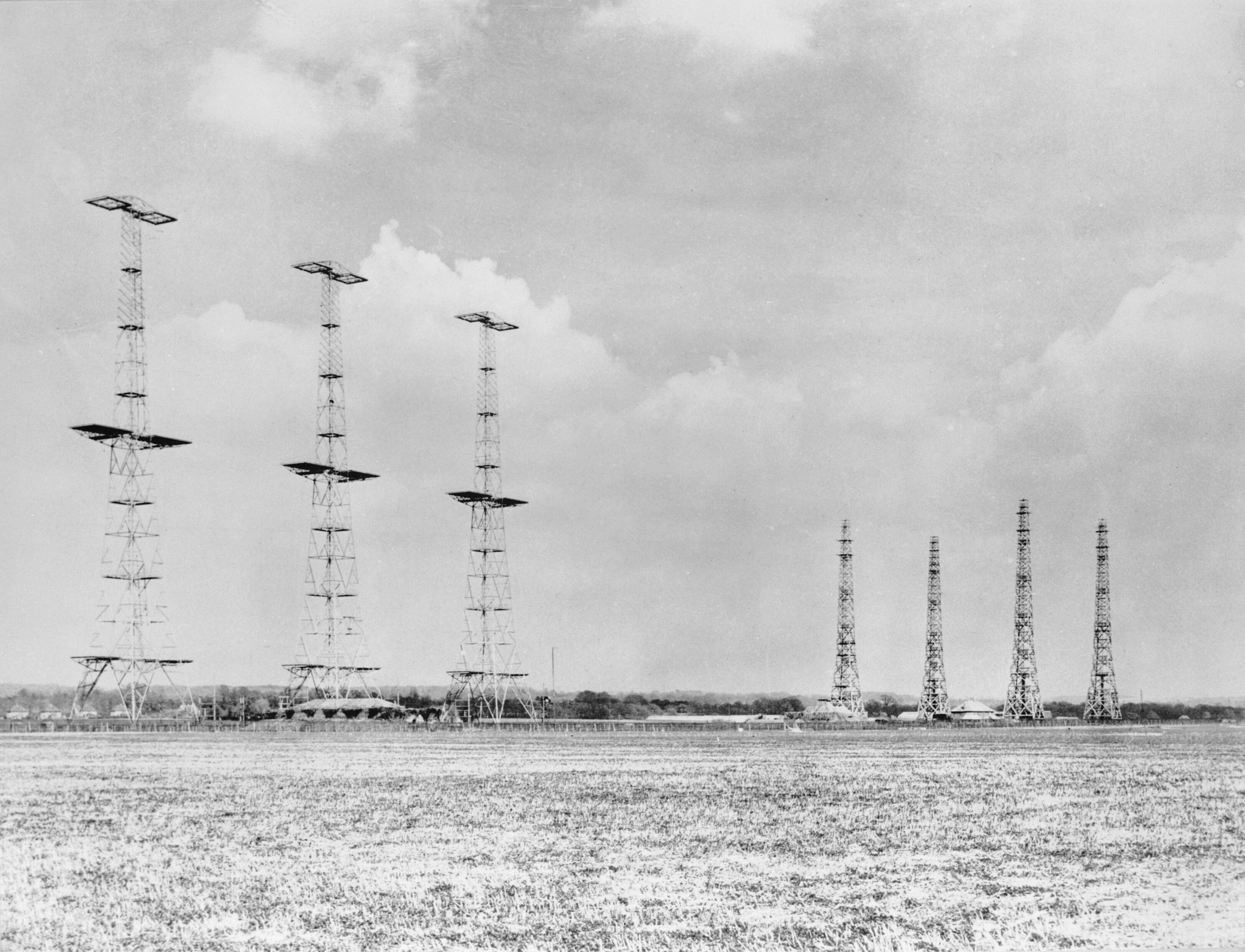
The Chain Home stations were so large that they were easily visible from France and German forces were aware of them from before the war.

Chain Home's (CH) large antennas were visible from the French coast, hence the Germans were aware of their precise locations. Their fixed-direction broadcasts towards the continent meant it was easy to determine which signal was broadcast by which station. This was aided by the way the stations spread out their broadcasts in a series of time slots, known as "running rabbits", which allowed a signal pulse to be traced back to a particular station through its timing.

Beginning in 1942, Dr. Wächter of Telefunken, working with radio engineers at the Reichspost, used this information to build a passive radar system using the CH broadcasts and their own receivers. This was not unlike the Daventry experiment setup that had first been used to demonstrate the radar concept in the UK in early 1935. In both cases, broadcasts from a distant station were used as a signal, and when an aircraft flew into the signal it reflected some of it to the receiver, creating a distinct "blip" on the display.

To this basic concept, Wächter added the ability to measure the rough azimuth of the target by turning the entire antenna and looking for the maximum signal. CH's relatively long wavelength, around 6 m, demanded very large receiver antennas and fairly complex antenna systems to support this rotation. Another side-effect of the long wavelength was that the angular resolution was relatively low, and although a lobe switching system was considered, it was apparently never used in service.

Several test systems were tested at Cherbourg in 1942 and 1943. The first operational KH system was built at the Nachtfalter (Moth) jamming station at Mont de Couple between Boulogne-sur-Mer and Calais, across the English Channel from Dover, which became operational near the end of 1943. A second station at Oostvoorne in the Netherlands (Biber/Beaver) followed in the spring of 1944. Four more stations were completed in 1944, Vaudricourt (Skorpion/Scorpion), Ostend (Bremse/Horsefly), Cap d'Antifer (Auerhahn/Grouse) and Cherbourg (Tausendfüssler/Centipede). These were built on Wassermann radar antennas, and sometimes used the Wassermann's own signals for height-finding duties.

== Description ==
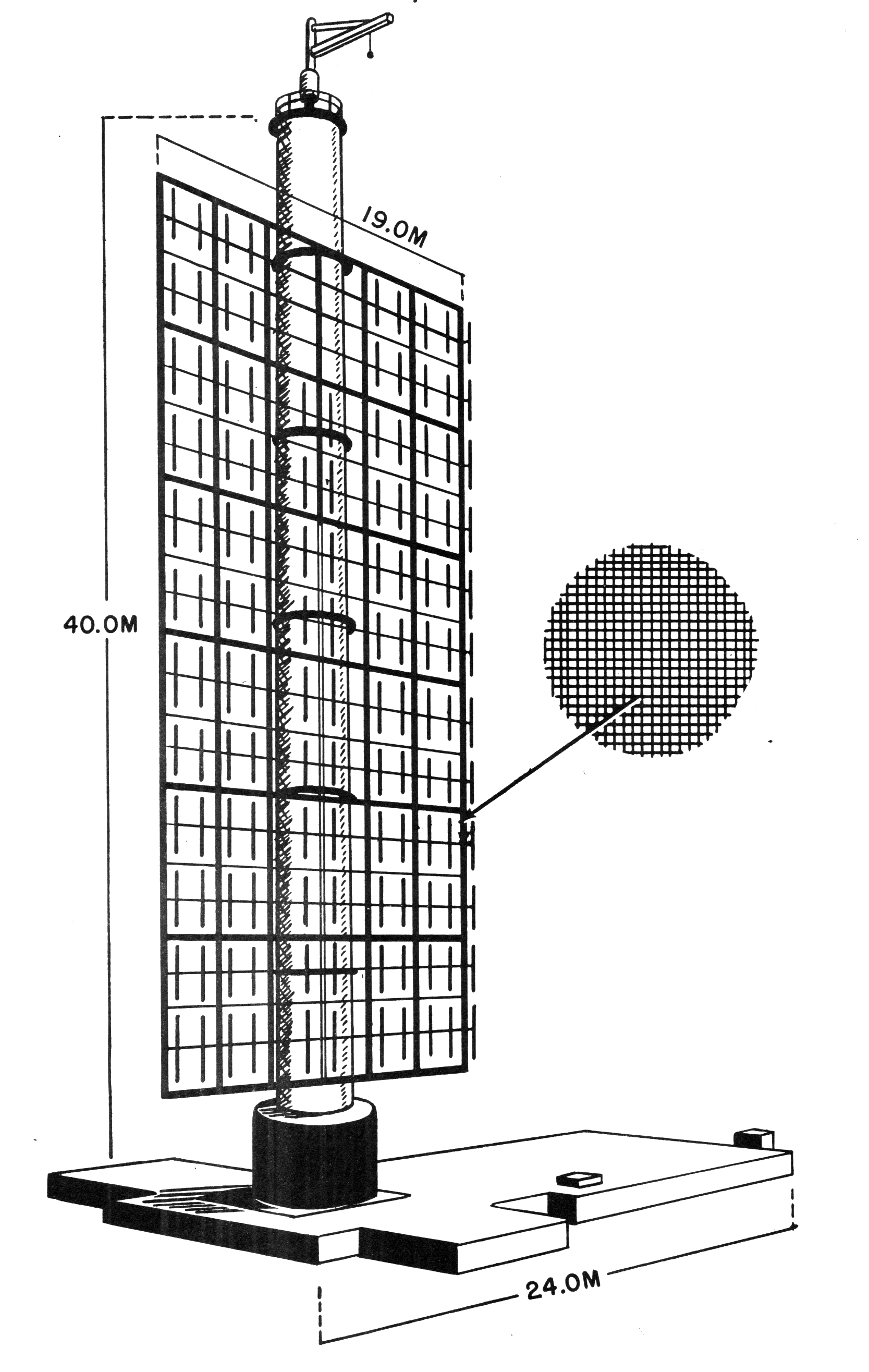
The primary antenna for KH was the huge Wasserman-S early warning radar.

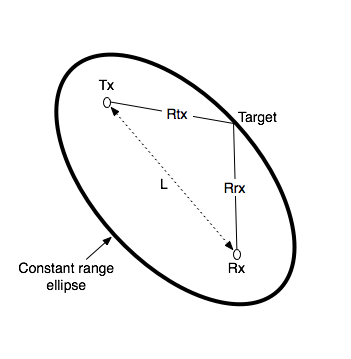
Klein Heidelberg measured the difference in time between the two paths: (Rtx + Rrx) - L. Any resulting value can be measured at many locations, which collectively form an ellipse.

The system used two antennas, a very large one on a rotating platform that was used to receive the signal reflected off the aircraft, and a much smaller one positioned about 60 metres (200 ft) away that received the signal directly from the CH station. The signals from both antennas were sent to two CRTs taken from the Würzburg radar, which, in typical German fashion, were used as J-scopes. This means distances are measured as the angle around the face of the tube, rather than the linear distance across it. A graduated scale around the outside of the CRT was used to measure the angles of the various "blips" in mils (0 to 400).

The operator would first select a single CH station by changing a timer so it picked up only the signals from that station. CH stations broadcast in time slots, one after the other, so it was easy to select a single station using a simple timer. The signal from the smaller antenna was sent to the left display. Using a hand wheel, the operator adjusted a delay circuit until the main blip of the directly received signal was at the 12 o'clock position on this display.

The right-hand CRT showed the signal received on the larger antenna. As the direct signal from the CH station was very powerful, it appeared on this display no matter what direction the antenna pointed. The display was set so that it showed only 1/20 of the 1/25 second time slot, that is, 2 milliseconds. The operator would then further fine-tune the timing so the direct signal was at the 12 o'clock position on this display as well.

When an aircraft flew in front of the larger antenna, some of the CH signal would reflect off it and into the receiver. Since the aircraft was not on the direct line between the two stations, the total distance travelled by the signal to the aircraft and then to the antenna will always be longer than the direct signal. (Note: Even if the aircraft is on the direct line between the two stations, the altitude of the aircraft adds several kilometres to the overall distance.) This means a second blip appears on the second display, some time after the direct signal. Measuring the angle around the face of the display using the attached scale revealed the difference in the signal's time of arrival compared to that of the direct signal, as an elapsed time.

For any given elapsed time difference, there is an infinite number of locations that match that delay. When plotted, these points form an ellipse with the CH station at one foci and the KH receiver at the other. Today, this is known as the bistatic range. To aid plotting these locations, each set of ten numbers on the circular scale, say 100 to 110, was assigned to a pre-calculated ellipse, in this case "ellipse 10". The operators would then select that ellipse on a set of provided charts.

To measure the angle to the target, the larger antenna was rotated around its vertical axis until the selected target blip was maximized, or alternately disappeared, or "nulled". The angle could then be read off a graduated scale that was mechanically linked to the antenna's rotation. The charts showed the ellipse and the location of the KH station; a line was drawn outward from the station's location at the measured angle, where it would eventually intersect the ellipse, locating the aircraft.

The 2 ms time slot corresponded to a range of 300 kilometres (190 mi), (Note: Light travels 300 km in 1 ms, but in this case the signal is travelling to and from the target, not one way.) but the system was capable of receiving signals on high-flying aircraft at even longer ranges. In these cases, the operator could use the timer controls to further delay the sweep on the second CRT so that it showed later times, adding that extra fixed delay back to the measured angle when looking up the correct ellipse on the charts. This allowed them to continue tracking as the aircraft flew over Germany.

Estimates vary as to the effectiveness of the system. Pritchard gives a range accuracy of 1 to 2 km with a bearing accuracy of 1 degree at 400 kilometres (250 mi) range, while Price suggests 6 miles (9.7 km) at 280 miles (450 km). Given the lack of lobe switching, the angle accuracy was more on the order of 10 degrees (+ or -5 degrees).
