= Manastash Ridge Radar =

Passive radar in Washington state, US

Coordinates: 46.9511°N 120.7246°W

The Manastash Ridge Radar is a passive radar which uses commercial FM broadcasts to study ionospheric turbulence as well as meteor trails, and aircraft. The radar is passive and bistatic; there are receivers located at the University of Washington as well as at Manastash Ridge, which are synchronized to permit coherent operation.

It is named for its location at the Manastash Ridge Observatory in the eastern foothills of the Cascade Mountains, near Ellensburg, Washington in the United States.

== See also ==
- Passive radar
