= HEMPAS-CCIAS Radar =

The HEMPAS-CCIAS radar is a passive radar developed by five Greek scientists.

== History ==
In 2006 after studying and planning for six years, the team applied to the Hellenic Army to participate in a research project for the construction and development of the CCIAS system. Simply put this was a network of "passive" radars.

Later in 2006 the Ministry of Defense, Chief of General Staff and Chief of Army Staff took part in the project. The Aristotle University of Thessaloniki team made the first presentation of the system to 60 Staff Officers. Immediately after the presentation without any doubt and hesitation, the political and military leadership excited calls for scientists to move quickly. More presentations followed to all sectors of the military. On February 13, 2009 the Council of Defence Planning met and after voting 7-0 in favor of the operational necessity of the system, recommended the urgent consideration of the issue by the Council of Chiefs. The then Chief of Defence General Dimitrios Grapsas, who was a great proponent of the development of the Greek, failed to put this issue on the agenda until his retirement in August 2009. The scientific team from the University of Thessaloniki, was not put off by the retirement of General Grapsas and continued its research. The last technical problems were resolved and everything looked ready for the building of the prototype system to commence.Almost a year later, the new Chief of General Staff General Ioannis Yiagkos, informed the scientists that the matter will be reconsidered.

On April 4, 2010, the Council of Chiefs met with the new Defence Minister E. Venizelos and with a 4-0 vote adopted the proposed system as extremely necessary and urgent. On May 29, 2010, the then vice Defence Minister Panagiotis Beglitis received the complete feasibility study.

The folder containing the top secret program contained 1050 pages. The time elapsed was considerable. However, the team of five scientists had received no answer. In June 2010 they sent letters to the Prime Minister and to the leader of the Opposition, to be aware of the situation.

Meanwhile, three foreign countries are interested to finance the program, but the scientists do not want to sell it. The status of the project is currently unknown.

== Abilities ==
- It can see without emitting and therefore remaining undetected, at a range of 400 km.
- It can identify helicopters and aircraft even under complete electronic mute, i.e. without their radars emitting anything.
- It can identify aircraft of stealth technology and real-time takeoffs of fighter aircraft from enemy bases.
- It can passively monitor islets.

== See also ==
- List of radars
