= Bistatic sonar =

Bistatic sonar is a sonar configuration in which transmitter and receiver are separated by a distance large enough to be comparable to the distance to the target. Most sonar systems are monostatic, in that the transmitter and receiver are located in the same place. A configuration with multiple receivers is called multistatic.

== Bistatic vs monostatic ==
=== Propagation (transmission) loss ===
This is a loss in sound level which happens while the sound pulse travels from projector to target and from target to receiver. There are 3 different mechanisms causing transmission Loss: spherical (or cylindrical in shallow water) spreading, absorbing and scattering by ocean media inhomogeneities. Transmission loss (TL) is proportional to range, (the farther the sound travels the more the loss), and to sound frequency. In monostatic sonar the sound first travels from projector to target, then the same way back from target to receiver, so two-way loss is just 2TL, where TL is one-way loss. In bistatic sonar the total loss (in decibels) is a sum of TL_{pt} (from projector to target) and TL_{tr} (from target to receiver).

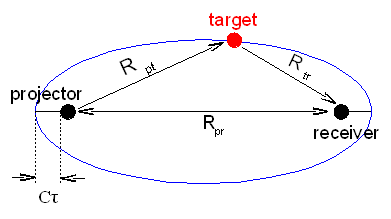
Bistatic sonar dead zone

=== Dead zone ===
In monostatic sonar, the first thing the receiver can hear is the sound of the transmitted ping. This sound level is very high, and it is impossible to detect the echo during the ping duration τ. That means targets are undetectable within the circle of Cτ/2 radius, where C is sound speed in water. This area is usually referred to as “dead zone”. If the sonar is close to the surface, bottom or both, (which may happen in shallow water), the dead zone may be greater than Cτ/2 due to a high level of reverberation.

In bistatic sonar, the travel distance from projector to target and from target to receiver is R = R_{pt} + R_{tr} . As the projector is separated from receiver by R_{pr} distance, first R_{pr} /C seconds after the ping starts, the receiver is just waiting. After that time, it receives direct signal from the projector (often referred to as “direct blast”,) which lasts τ seconds. So the sonar cannot detect targets within the ellipse R = Rpr + Cτ, as shown at the picture. High level reverberation in the projector area does not affect the dead zone.

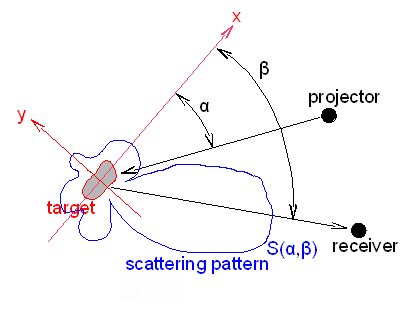
Target scattering pattern

=== Target scattering pattern ===
Targets do not reflect the sound omni-directionally. The mechanism of sound reflection (or scattering by the target) is complicated, because the target is not just a rigid sphere. Scattered sound level depends on the angle β from which the target is ensonified by the projector, and it also varies with angle scattering direction α (refer to local target axes Z{x,y}). These angles are often referred to as aspects. This scattered sound level vs (α, β) function is called the scattering pattern S(α, β). Direction of maximum echo (maximum of S(α, β)) also depends on target shape and inner structure. So sometimes the best ensonifying aspect is not the same as the best receive aspect.

This leads to the bistatic solution. Target scattering becomes even more complicated if the target is buried (or semi-buried) into sea bottom sediments. (That happens to sea mines, waste containers, shipwrecks, etc.) In that case, the scattering mechanism is affected not by target features only, but also by sound wave interaction between the target and surrounding bottom.

== Specific classes of bistatic sonars ==
=== Backscattering and forward scattering ===
Monostatic sonar reception

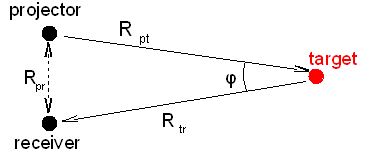
Bistatic backscattering

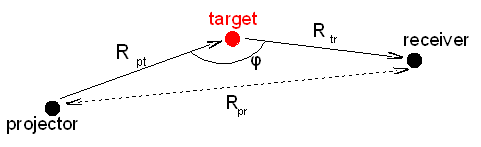
Bistatic forward scattering

In monostatic sonar the receiver is listening to the echo which is reflected (scattered) right back from the target. Bistatic sonar can work in two ways: by utilizing either the target backscattering or forward scattering. Backscattering bistatic sonar is the sonar in which the bistatic angle φ is less than 90°. Forward scattering is the physical phenomena based on Babinet's principle. Forward scattering bistatic sonar is the sonar in which the bistatic angle φ is greater than 90°.

=== Pseudo-monostatic sonar ===
This is the sonar with a small bistatic angle. In other words, both the range from projector to target R_{pt} and from target to receiver R_{tr} is much greater than the distance from projector to receiver R_{pr}.

=== Multistatic sonar ===
This is the multi-node system with more than one projector, receiver or both.

== Applications ==
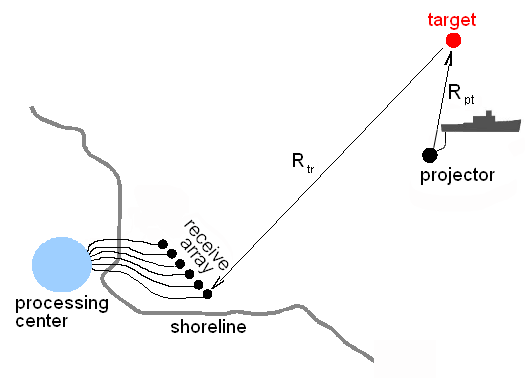
Long range surveillance

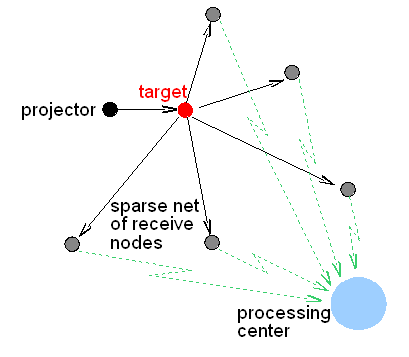
A net of receivers with a single projector

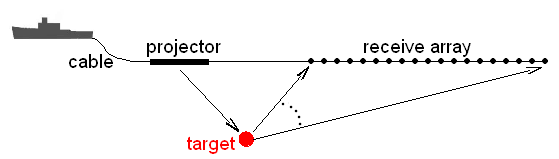
Low frequency towed sonar

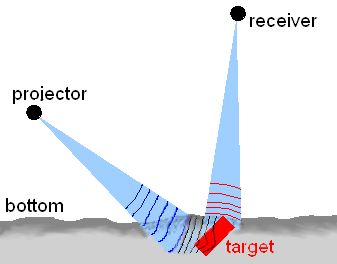
Buried objects detection

=== Long range surveillance ===
For coastal surveillance, a large receive array of hydrophones is usually deployed close to the shore and connected with cables to a land-based processing center. To enable long range target detection (far away from the shore), one can use a powerful mobile projector, deployable from the ship. A system of this kind exploits the idea of “bringing the projector closer to area of interest and getting the transmission loss down”.

=== Large area surveillance with a single projector and a net of receivers ===
A system of this type is multistatic. It exploits the idea of “cover the area of interest with a sparse net of receivers and ensonify the whole area with a powerful projector”. Receive nodes may be sonobuoys (with radio communication link to a processing center) or autonomous underwater vehicles (AUVs) with an acoustic communication link. The example is GOATS project, using AUVs as receive nodes.

=== Low frequency towed sonar ===
The lower the frequency, the less the transmission loss absorbing and scattering components. On the other hand, the lower the frequency, the larger the size of directional projector and receive array. So the ship-deployable long range sonar is a low frequency bistatic towed array sonar with spatially separated projector and receive array. The example is LFATS towed sonar.

=== Buried object detection ===
To detect a buried object, the transmit ping must penetrate into the bottom. That requires a powerful and highly directional projector. Next, a directional receiver should be placed at the point where the “target + surrounding bottom” reflection is the best. This is a bistatic system. The example is SITAR project, developed to find objects like toxic waste containers and mines.

The principal advantages of bistatic and multistatic sonar include:

- Lower procurement and maintenance costs (if using a third party's transmitter)
- Operation without a frequency clearance (if using a third party's transmitter)
- Covert operation of the receiver
- Increased resilience to electronic countermeasures as waveform being used and receiver location are potentially unknown
- Possible enhanced radar cross section of the target due to geometrical effects

The principal disadvantages of bistatic and multistatic sonar include:

- System complexity
- Costs of providing communication between sites
- Lack of control over transmitter (if exploiting a third party transmitter)
- Harder to deploy
- Reduced low-level coverage due to the need for line-of-sight from several locations

== See also ==
- Sonar
- Bistatic radar

== Sources ==
- Bistatic Sonar, explained. Alexander Yakubovskiy, FarSounder Inc.
