= Manastash Ridge Observatory =

U.S. astronomical observatory

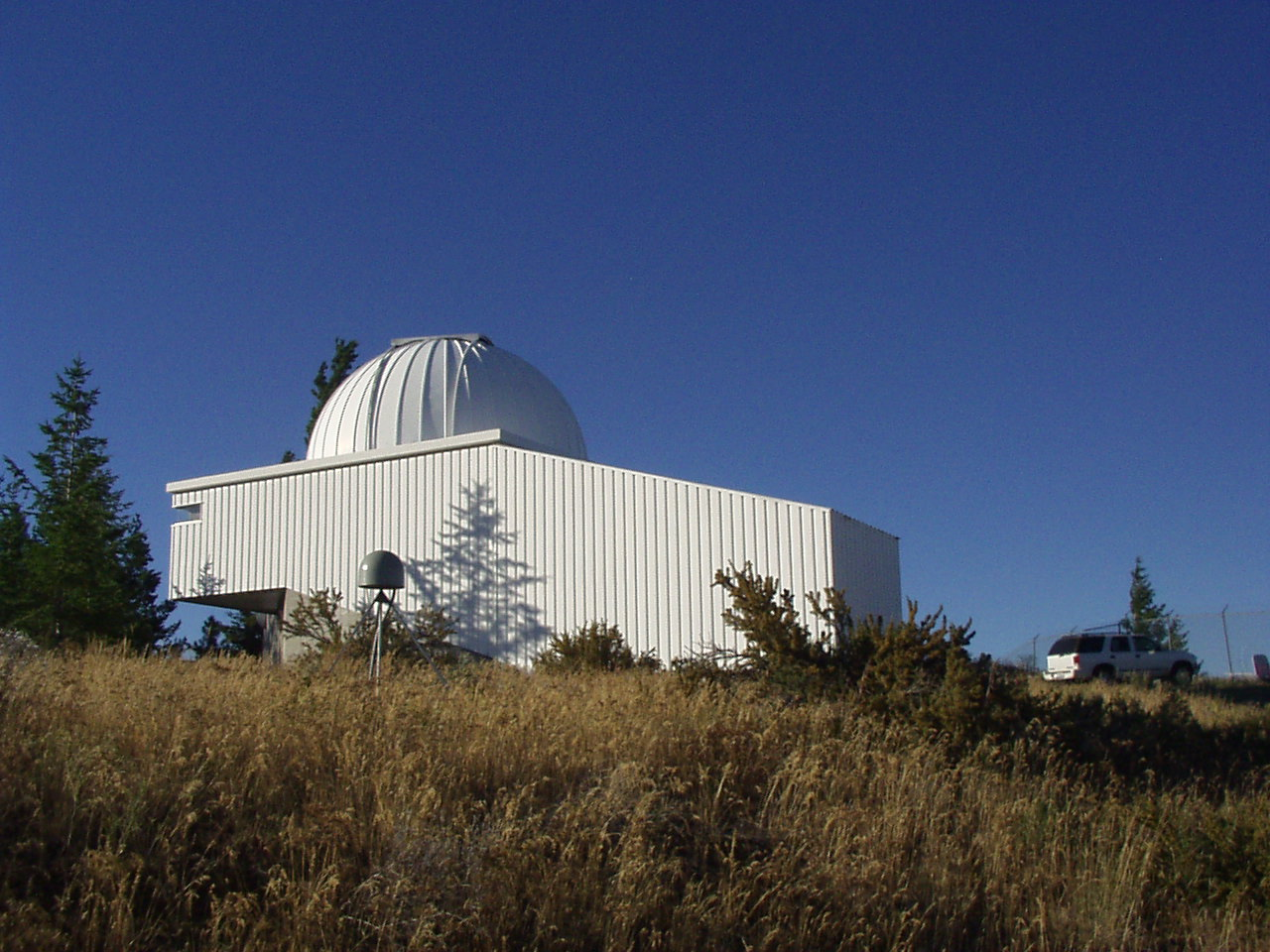
- Manastash Ridge Observatory
- Organization: University of Washington
- Observatory code: 664
- Location: near Ellensburg, Washington
- Coordinates: 46.9511°N 120.7245°W
- Altitude: 1,198 meters (3,930 ft)
- Established: 1972
- Website: Manastash Ridge Observatory

Telescopes
- Boller and Chivens Telescope: 0.75 m Cassegrain

The Manastash Ridge Observatory (MRO) is an astronomical observatory built in 1972 by the University of Washington. It is located in a remote area approximately 14 kilometers (8.7 mi) west of Ellensburg, Washington, at an altitude of 3930' (1198 m), a longitude of 120.7278 degrees West, and a latitude of +46.9528 degrees, and can be reached by dirt roads from Ellensburg or Selah. The observatory features a 0.75 m (30 in) Ritchey-Chrétien telescope built by Boller and Chivens. Currently, the observatory utilizes an Andor thermo-electrically cooled CCD camera in conjunction with the primary telescope. Initially used for professional and graduate research, the observatory is now used mostly by undergraduate students for instruction and research. For a brief time there was talk of stopping funding for MRO as the University of Washington Astronomy Department focus on the Apache Point Observatory, but funding did continue and MRO is still in use.

The Manastash Ridge Radar (MRR) is located in the MRO building. MRR is a bistatic, passive radar controlled by the University of Washington's Radar Remote Sensing Laboratory (RRSL) led by Dr. John Sahr. MRR uses commercial FM radio broadcasts from Seattle to sense ionospheric turbulence, meteors, and airplanes. The receivers are located at the University of Washington and at MRO.

In 2015 MRO was granted $59,999 from the University of Washington's Campus Sustainability Fund (CSF) in an effort to have the observatory run in a more eco-friendly manner. According to the project's Letter of Intent, the main goals were to reduce water and energy consumption. To conserve water they have installed a rainwater harvesting system that can hold 10,000 US gallons (38,000 L; 8,300 imp gal) of water in its tank and can fully supply the MRO's water usage. To conserve energy they have installed two solar panels which will produce more than the necessary 20,000 kWh per year needed to sustain the observatory.

== The Telescope ==
The MRO 30" is an f/13.5 telescope with achromatic focal reducing optics mounted approximately one inch behind the Cassegrain focus to create an effective focal ratio f/6.7. The focal reducing optics are optimized for the wavelength range of 3650-8520 Å. The field of view (using the Andor iKon-M 934 imaging camera attached to the telescope) is 8 x 8 arcminutes with a plate scale (using the default 2 x 2 binning) of 0.93 "/pixel.

== See also ==
- List of astronomical observatories
