= CLidar =

Instrument for measuring aerosols in the lower atmosphere

The CLidar is a scientific instrument used for measuring particulates (aerosols) in the lower atmosphere. CLidar stands for camera lidar, which in turn is a portmanteau of "light" and "radar". It is a form of remote sensing and used for atmospheric physics.

== Description ==
In this technique a very wide-angle lens images light scattered from a laser beam onto a CCD (Charge-coupled device) camera. The camera is positioned hundreds of meters away from the (usually vertically-pointed) laser beam. The geometry of the CLidar is shown in the figure. It is important in the analysis that the optics, the wide-angle lens in this case, accurately maps equal angles onto an equal number of pixels throughout the 100 degree field-of-view.

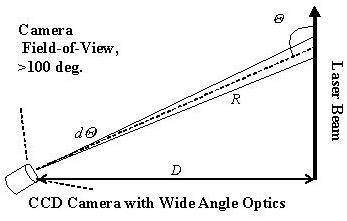

== Example ==
In the second figure, an image from the CCD camera is shown which is analyzed by adding up the individual pixels at each altitude. The camera was 122 meters from the vertically pointed, circularly-polarized laser beam. The beam is brighter near the ground due to near-ground aerosols. A bright spot due to a cloud can be seen near the top of the beam. The beam was positioned diagonally on the CCD array to use the space more effectively. A lighthouse and power pole can also be seen in the image.

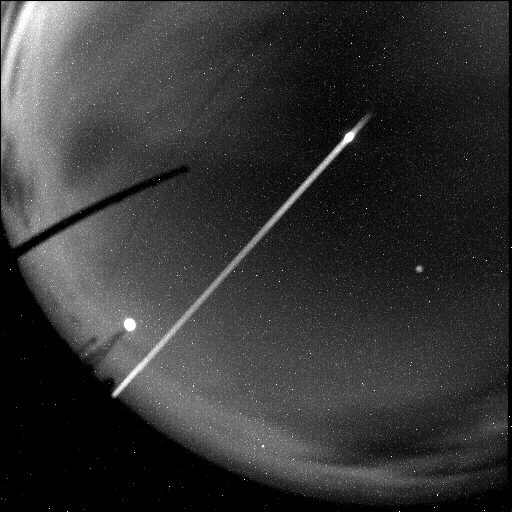

== Differences between Lidar and CLidar ==
The CLidar technique has the advantage over the lidar technique of being able to measure all the way to the ground. This difference derives from their distinct geometric configurations, where in the lidar technique the receiving telescope and sourcing optics are monostatic (axially aligned) while the receiving and outputting optics for the CLidar technique are bistatic (non-zero perpendicular distance between receiving and outputting optics). The signal strength is also much more constant than a lidar signal which can change by many orders of magnitude. It has very high altitude resolution in the lower atmosphere. The instrument components are typically simpler than those in the lidar also.

Disadvantages include poor altitude resolution in the upper atmosphere, difficulty designing optics that gathers substantial amounts of light, and a loss in noise rejection (signal-to-noise ratio).

== Sources ==
- Barnes, J. E., S. Bronner, R. Beck, and N. C. Parikh, Boundary layer scattering measurements with a CCD camera lidar, Applied Optics, 42, 2647-2652, 2003.
- Barnes, John E., N. C. Parikh Sharma and Trevor B. Kaplan, Atmospheric aerosol profiling with a bistatic imaging lidar system, Applied Optics, 46, 2922-2929, May, 2007.
