= Monopulse radar =

Single-pulse radar system

Monopulse radar is a radar system that uses additional encoding of the radio signal to provide accurate directional information. The name refers to its ability to extract range and direction from a single signal pulse.

Monopulse radar avoids problems seen in conical scanning radar systems, which can be confused by rapid changes in signal strength. The system also makes jamming more difficult. Most radars designed since the 1960s are monopulse systems. The monopulse method is also used in passive systems, such as electronic support measures and radio astronomy. Monopulse radar systems can be constructed with reflector antennas, lens antennas or array antennas.

Historically, monopulse systems have been classified as either phase-comparison monopulse or amplitude-comparison monopulse. Modern systems determine the direction from the monopulse ratio, which contain both amplitude and phase information. The monopulse method does not require that the measured signals are pulsed. The alternative name "simultaneous lobing" has therefore been suggested, but not popularized.

== Background ==
=== Conical scan ===
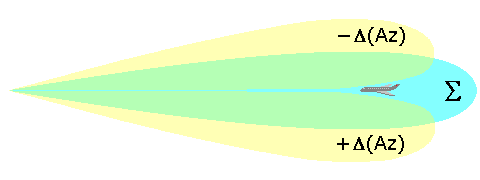
Conical scanning and monopulse radars use a beam that is slightly spread out across the antenna's centreline.

Conical scanning is not considered to be a form of monopulse radar, but the following summary provides background that can aid understanding.

The beam from a radar is in the form of a cone several degrees across, typically on the order of 5 to 10 degrees. Any target within the beam will return a signal, so it is not an accurate location in space, especially at long distances. A number of methods have been introduced to improve the accuracy.

Conical scan systems send out a signal slightly to one side of the antenna's boresight and then rotate the feed horn to make the lobe rotate around the boresight line. A target centered on the boresight is always slightly illuminated by the lobe, and provides a strong return. If the target is to one side, it will be illuminated only when the lobe is pointed in that general direction, resulting in a weaker signal overall (or a flashing one if the rotation is slow enough). This varying signal will reach a maximum when the antenna is rotated so it is aligned in the direction of the target.

By looking for this maximum and moving the antenna in that direction, a target can be automatically tracked. This is greatly eased by using two antennas, angled slightly to either side of the boresight. Tracking can be accomplished by comparing the signal from the two antennas in simple electronics, as opposed to having to hunt for a maximum point over the period of the antenna's rotation.

One problem with this approach is that radar signals often change in amplitude for reasons that have nothing to do with beam position. Over the period of a few tenths of seconds, for instance, changes in target heading, rain clouds and other issues can dramatically affect the returned signal. Since conical scanning systems depend on the signal growing or weakening due only to the position of the target relative to the beam, such changes in reflected signal can cause it to be "confused" about the position of the target within the beam's scanning area.

Jamming a conical scanner is also relatively easy. The jammer simply has to send out signals on the radar's frequency with enough strength to make it think that was the strongest return. In this case, a series of random short bursts of the signal will appear to be a series of targets in different locations within the beam. Jamming of this sort can be made more effective by timing the signals to be the same as the rotational speed of the feed, but broadcast at a slight delay, which results in a second strong peak within the beam, with nothing to distinguish the two. Jammers of this sort were deployed quite early. The British used them during World War II against the German conical-scanning Würzburg radar.

== Description ==
=== Monopulse basics ===
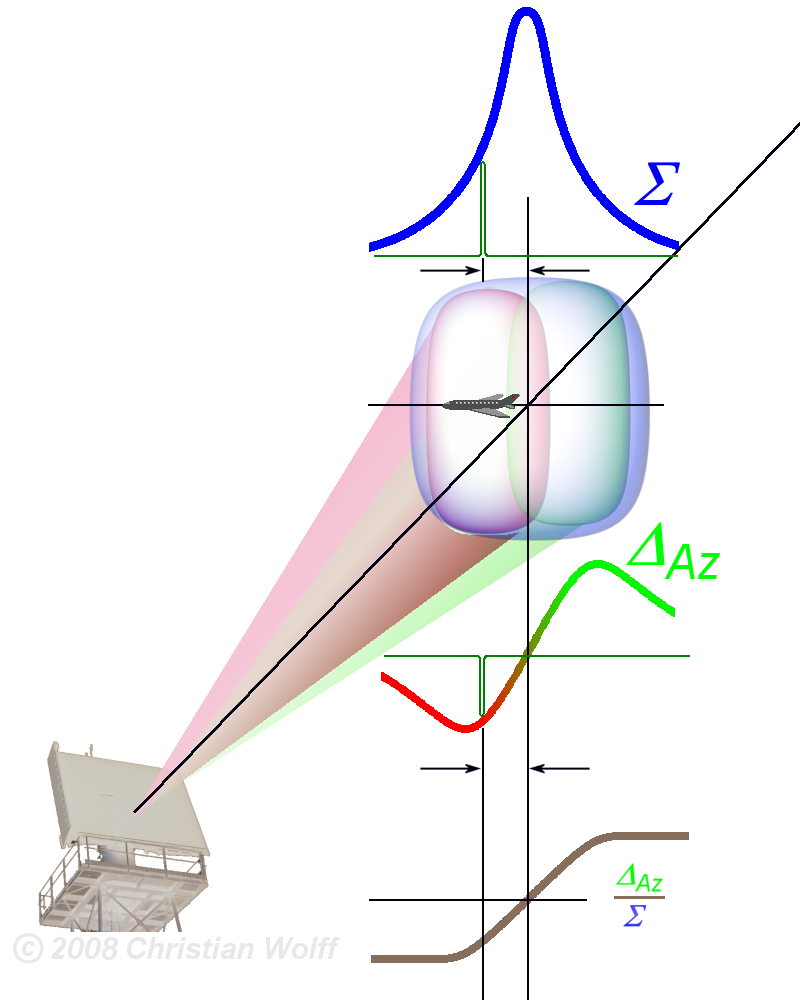
Monopulse beam of a phased array antenna split in two lobes.

Monopulse radars are similar in general construction to conical scanning systems, but split the beam into parts and then send the two resulting signals out of the antenna in slightly different directions. When the reflected signals are received, they are amplified separately and compared to each other, indicating which direction has a stronger return, and thus the general direction of the target relative to the boresight. Since this comparison is carried out during one pulse, which is typically a few microseconds, changes in target position or heading will have no effect on the comparison.

Making such a comparison requires that different parts of the beam be distinguished from each other. Normally this is achieved by splitting the pulse into two parts and polarizing each one separately before sending it to a set of slightly off-axis feed horns. This results in a set of lobes, usually two, overlapping on the boresight. These lobes are then rotated as in a normal conical scanner. On reception the signals are separated again, and then one signal is inverted in power and the two are then summed ($\Sigma$ in the image). If the target is to one side of the boresight, the resulting sum will be positive, if it's on the other, negative.

If the lobes are closely spaced, this signal can produce a high degree of pointing accuracy within the beam, adding to the natural accuracy of the conical scanning system. Whereas classical conical scan systems generate pointing accuracy on the order of 0.1°, monopulse radars generally improve this by a factor of 10, and advanced tracking radars like the AN/FPS-16 are accurate to 0.006°. This is an accuracy of about 10 m at a distance of 100 km.

Jamming resistance is greatly improved over conical scanning. Filters can be inserted to remove any signal that is either unpolarized or polarized only in one direction. In order to confuse such a system, the jamming signal would have to duplicate the polarization of the signal as well as the timing, but since the aircraft receives only one lobe, determining the precise polarization of the signal is difficult. Against monopulse systems, ECM has generally resorted to broadcasting white noise to simply blind the radar, instead of attempting to produce false localized returns.

==== Implementation for reflector antennas ====
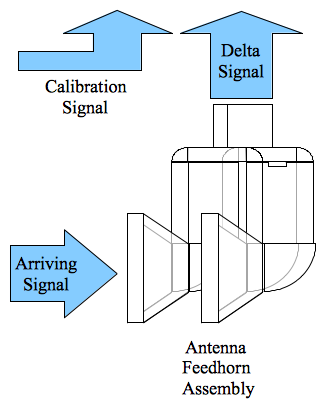
Radio-frequency signals arriving at the surface of the antenna feed-horns are combined electrically to produce delta signals. The assembly that is shown produces a left/right delta signal based on an arriving radio frequency signal that is horizontally polarized.

Monopulse antennas produce a sum signal and two delta signals. This allows angular measurement to be performed using a single receive pulse. The sum signal usually passes back down the waveguide used to send the transmit pulse. The two delta signals are elevation (up–down) and traverse (left–right).

The sum signal corresponds with the antenna beam along center-line of the antenna. The delta signals are pairs of beams that are adjacent to the center-line of the sum antenna beam. The delta beam measurements produce plus or minus values depending upon the quadrant.

Quadrants	Left	Right
Up	Quadrant II: +ΔEl −ΔAz	Quadrant I: +ΔEl +ΔAz
Down	Quadrant III: −ΔEl −ΔAz	Quadrant IV: −ΔEl +ΔAz

The sum signal is created by a feedhorn structure positioned to maximize signal at the center of the antenna beam. The delta RF signals are created by pairs of antenna feed-horns located adjacent to the sum feed-horn (sum feed-horn not shown in the figure). The output of each pair of delta feed-horns are added together, and this creates zero output signal when the incoming RF signal is located at the center of the antenna beam. The signal strength from each delta beam increases as the aircraft drifts further away from the antenna center-line.

For the waveguide image that is shown, a horizontally polarized RF signal arrives at the two feed horns to produce a left/right delta signal. The arriving energy from the RF wavefront is launched into both waveguide feedhorns. The RF signal from both feedhorns travels up the waveguide where the signals from the left and right feedhorn are combined. The combiner performs a mathematical subtraction on the electrical signals arriving from the feedhorns. That subtraction produces the delta signal. A similar feedhorn configuration is used to produce the up/down delta signal (not shown). The waveguide assembly can be used by itself. For a high gain antenna, the feedhorn assembly is located facing the reflecting surface at or near the focal point.

For the waveguide image that is shown, the sum signal would be created by a single waveguide feedhorn centered between the two feedhorns that are shown.

The sum and delta radio frequency signals are converted to a lower frequency in the receiver where sampling takes place. A signal processor produces the error signal using these samples.

The + or − value for each delta signal is created by phase shift of 0° or 180° when compared with the sum signal. A calibration signal is injected into the receive path when the radar is idle, and this establishes a known phase shift between different microwave signal paths (quiescent mode).

The angle error is created from the delta signal by performing a complex ratio. This is done for the left/right delta beams, and this is also done for the up/down delta beams (two ratios). An explanation of how real and imaginary parts are used with RADAR can be found in the description of pulse Doppler.

$$\text{Error} =
\frac{\dfrac{(\text{Real delta}) + i (\text{Imaginary delta})}
{(\text{Real sum}) + i (\text{Imaginary sum})} }
{\dfrac{(\text{Real delta cal}) + i (\text{Imaginary delta cal})}
{(\text{Real sum cal}) + i (\text{Imaginary sum cal})} }.$$

The result is a signed number. The outcome of the calibration process is to rotate the complex antenna angle error vector onto the real axis to reduce signal processing losses.

The angle error is used to make an adjustment to position the target along the centerline of the antenna. On mechanically steered radar, the vertical angle error drives a motor that moves the antenna up or down, and the horizontal angle error drives a motor that steers the antenna left or right. On a missile, the angle error is an input to the guidance system that positions the guidance fins that rotate the body of the missile so that the target is in the centerline of the antenna.

A wheel, mirror and a light can be used to visualize real and imaginary described in this equation. The mirror is placed at a 45 degree angle above the wheel so that you can see the front and top of the wheel at the same time. The light is attached to the wheel so that you can see the wheel when the room lights are turned off. You sit directly in front of the wheel while a friend rotates the wheel. The view of the front of the wheel (real) and the top of the wheel (imaginary) tell you the position of the wheel.

Pairs of real and imaginary values form a complex number explained as real and imaginary parts.

Dynamic calibration is needed when there are long waveguide runs between the antenna and first down converter (see Superheterodyne receiver). This compensates for temperature changes that alter the size and length of wave-guide, which will cause phase variations that produce incorrect angle error signals for long wave-guide runs. The Cal term is created by injecting a calibration signal into the receive waveguide while the system is not active (sum and delta). The angle error of the calibration signal is used to evaluate angle error during normal operation. Antenna tuning is used to make adjustments that create the desired error signal when the antenna is calibrated on an antenna range.

When the waveguide run is short between the antenna and receiver, the calibration signal can be omitted and the calibration term can be set to a fixed value. A fixed value may also be stored for systems with long wave-guide runs to allow degraded operation when RF calibration cannot be performed. The waveguide assembly may need to be tuned using an antenna range to obtain consistent results.

==== Implementation for array antennas ====
The four-quadrant array antenna consists of four sub-arrays. The sub-arrays are separated by a distance d. The angle θ (in either elevation or azimuth) is estimated from the monopulse ratio, which is the ratio of the difference signal over the sum signal. The estimation equation is given by
$$\Delta/\Sigma = -j \tan \left( \frac{\pi d}{\lambda} \sin \theta \right).$$
The derivation of a more general form of this equation is presented by Frid and Jonsson.

=== Antenna positioning ===
Tracking systems produce constant aircraft position information, and the antenna position is part of this information. Antenna error signals are used to create feedback as part of a RADAR system that can track aircraft.

The horizontal signal and the vertical signal created from antenna RF samples are called angle errors. These angle error signals indicate the angular distance between the center of the antenna beam and the position of the aircraft within the antenna beam.

For a mechanically steered antenna, the horizontal signal and vertical signal are used to create a drive signal that creates torque for two antenna positioning motors. One motor moves the antenna left/right. The other motor drives the antenna up/down. The result is to move the antenna position so that the center of the antenna beam remains aimed directly at the aircraft even when the aircraft is moving perpendicular to the antenna beam.

For a track while scan radar, position and velocity is maintained for multiple aircraft. The last position of the aircraft is coasted using the velocity, and that information is used to direct a beam of energy toward the aircraft. The monopulse angle error information that is received is used to adjust the position and velocity data for the aircraft. This is a common mode with phased array radar systems.

Amplitude-Comparison Monopulse provides an explanation of the antenna signals involved in this process.

==== Doppler ====
Doppler effect can be used to separate different objects based on speed. Pulse Doppler RADAR signal processing uses this technique. This is combined with conical scanning or monopulse to improve track reliability. It is necessary to separate the object signal from the interference to avoid being pulled off the object. This avoids problems where the system is fooled by aircraft flying too close to the surface of the earth or aircraft flying through clouds.

Conical scan and monopulse antennas are susceptible to interference from weather phenomenon and stationary objects. The resulting interference can produce feedback signals that move the antenna beam away from the aircraft. This can produce an unreliable antenna position when the antenna is aimed too near the ground or too near to heavy weather. Systems with no Pulse Doppler tracking mode may remain aimed at irrelevant objects like trees or clouds. Constant operator attention is required when there is no Doppler signal processing.

== History ==
Monopulse radar was extremely "high tech" when it was first introduced by Robert M. Page in 1943 in a Naval Research Laboratory experiment. As a result, it was very expensive, labor-intensive due to complexity, and less reliable. It was only used when extreme accuracy was needed that justified the cost. Early uses included the Nike Ajax missile, which demanded very high accuracy, or for tracking radars used for measuring various rocket launches. The world's first airborne monopulse radar system was the British Ferranti-designed AIRPASS system which went into service in 1960 on the RAF's English Electric Lightning interceptor aircraft. An early monopulse radar development, in 1958, was the AN/FPS-16, on which NRL and RCA collaborated. The earliest version, XN-1, utilised a metal plate lens. The second version XN-2 used a conventional 3.65 meter [12 ft] parabolic antenna, and was the version which went to production. These radars played an important part in the Mercury, Gemini, and early Apollo missions, being deployed in Bermuda, Tannarive, and Australia, among other places for that purpose. The IRACQ [Increased Range ACQuisition] modification was installed on certain of these installations; certainly the one located at Woomera, Australia was so modified. One of the larger installations first appeared in the 1970s as the US Navy's AN/SPY-1 radar used on the Aegis Combat System, and MK-74 radar used on Tartar Guided Missile Fire Control System and research. The cost and complexity of implementing monopulse tracking was reduced and reliability increased when digital signal processing became available after the 1970s. The technology is found in most modern tracking radars and many types of disposable ordnance like missiles.

== See also ==
- Amplitude monopulse
- Phase-comparison monopulse
- AIRPASS
