= Terrestrial high-definition television =

Terrestrial high-definition television is a form of broadcast high-definition television that is received via the terrestrial airwaves using either a VHF television aerial or a UHF television aerial. Depending on the country, the high definition television channels are broadcasts using either ATSC, ISDB-T, DVB-T or DVB-T2.

== Countries that have terrestrial high-definition television ==
World map of countries that have terrestrial high-definition television. Countries with terrestrial HDTV using ATSC Countries with terrestrial HDTV using DVB-T and/or DVB-T2 Countries with terrestrial HDTV using ISDB-T Countries without any form of terrestrial HDTV No information available

=== America ===
- United States using ATSC
- Canada using ATSC
- Brazil using ISDB-T

=== Europe ===
- United Kingdom using DVB-T2 under the name Freeview HD
- Ireland using DVB-T MPEG-4 under the name Saorview
- France using DVB-T MPEG-4 under the name Télévision Numérique Terrestre
- Norway using DVB-T MPEG-4
- Sweden using DVB-T2
- Finland using DVB-T2
- Denmark using DVB-T MPEG-4
- Italy using DVB-T2 under the name Europa 7 HD
- Cyprus using DVB-T MPEG-4
- Slovenia using DVB-T MPEG-4
- Austria using DVB-T2 under the name simpliTV
- Croatia using DVB-T2 under the name evotv
- Hungary using DVB-T MPEG-4
- Slovakia using DVB-T MPEG-4 under the name Towercom

=== Africa ===
- Morocco using DVB-T MPEG-4

=== Asia ===
- Japan using ISDB-T
- South Korea using ATSC
- Israel using DVB-T MPEG-4 under the name Idan+

=== Oceania ===
- Australia using DVB-T MPEG-2 under the name Freeview
- New Zealand using DVB-T MPEG-4 under the name Freeview

== Countries without terrestrial high-definition television ==
Some countries such as Germany, The Netherlands and Belgium may only broadcasts their channels in standard definition via the terrestrial airwaves. This is largely because the uptake of cable television may be higher than that of terrestrial television, thus giving broadcasters very little incentive to provide their high-definition services via the terrestrial airwaves.
