= Amplitude-comparison monopulse =

Radio direction finding technique

Amplitude-comparison monopulse refers to a common direction finding technique. This method is used in monopulse radar, electronic warfare and radio astronomy. Amplitude monopulse antennas are usually reflector antennas.

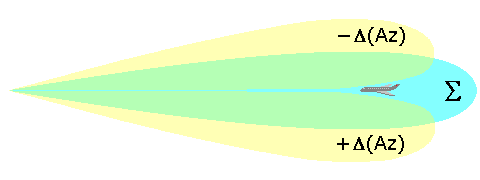
Illustration of sum-difference beams

== Approach ==
Two overlapping antenna beams are formed, which are steered in slightly different directions, usually such that they overlap at the half-power point (-3 dB-point) of the beams. By comparing the relative amplitude of the pulse in the two beams, its position in the beams can be determined with an accuracy dependent on the signal-to-noise ratio (SNR). An accuracy of a tenth of beamwidth can be achieved with an SNR of 10 dB.

In most implementations, two signals are formed, one being the sum of the two beams, and the other being the difference of the two beams. The ratio of these two beams normalises the difference signal and allows the direction of arrival of the signal to be calculated. The shape of the antenna beams must be known exactly and hence the accuracy of the techniques can be affected by unwanted multipath reflections.

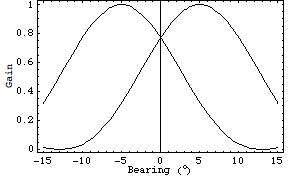
Two beams, steered so that they overlap

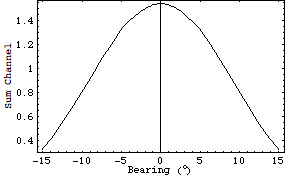
Sum of the two beam patterns

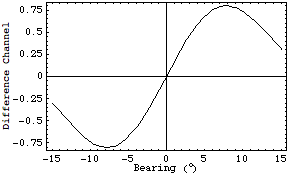
Difference of the two beam patterns

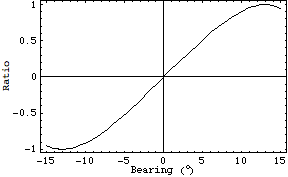
Ratio of the sum-difference patterns

== See also ==
- Monopulse radar
- Phase-Comparison Monopulse
