= Phase-comparison monopulse =

Technique in radio direction finding

Phase-comparison monopulse is a technique used in radio frequency (RF) applications such as radar and direction finding to accurately estimate the direction of arrival of a signal from the phase difference of the signal measured on two (or more) separated antennas or more typically from displaced phase centers of an array antenna. Phase-comparison monopulse differs from amplitude-comparison monopulse in that the former uses displaced phase centers with a common beam pointing direction, while the latter uses a common phase center and displaced beam pointing directions.

In phase-comparison monopulse, typically an array is subdivided into sub-arrays, and then a "sum" and a "difference" or "del" channel are formed. For a linear array, these subarrays would each be half of the elements, divided in the middle. For a planar array, these sub-arrays would be the four quadrants of the array, each with 1/4 of the array's elements. In a linear array, the output of each sub-array is summed to form the "sum" channel, and the same outputs are subtracted to form the "del" channel. The monopulse ratio is formed by dividing the imaginary part of the del channel by the real part of the sum channel. This ratio gives an error signal that indicates to a high degree of accuracy the actual target angle as compared to the center of the beam. For a planar array, one sum channel is formed as the sum of the outputs of all four quadrants, but two del channels are formed, one for the elevation dimension and one for the orthogonal azimuth dimension. Two monopulse ratios are formed just as with a linear array, each one indicating the deviation angle in one dimension from the center of the beam.

There are some common misconceptions about phase comparison monopulse. First, only one beam is formed. Monopulse processing is done entirely with the received signal in the array manifold and beam forming network. Speaking in terms of only one dimension for clarity, such as with a linear array, the signal is received by the array and summed into each of two subarrays with displaced phase centers. The sum channel is formed simply by adding these two subarray outputs, and the result is exactly the same as if the entire array was initially summed in one step. The del channel is formed simply by subtracting these same subarray outputs. Second, phase-comparison monopulse doesn't technically actually do a phase comparison, but rather simply divides the del channel by the sum channel to arrive at a ratio wherein the angle information is encoded. The following mathematical derivation should make it clear why this is so.

== Mathematics ==
=== Sum Pattern ===
We can define the beam pattern (array factor) of a uniform linear array (ULA) with N elements, as:

$B_\theta \left( \theta \right) = \vec{w}^H \vec{v}_\theta \left( \theta \right) = \sum_{n=0}^{N-1}w_n^* \left[ \vec{v}_\theta \left( \theta \right) \right]_n = \sum_{n=0}^{N-1}w_n^* e^{j \left( n- \frac{N-1}{2} \right) \frac{2\pi}{\lambda} d cos \theta}$, where $\vec{v}_\theta$ is the array manifold vector and $\vec{w}$ is a vector of complex weights representing amplitude and phase adjustments applied to each antenna element. The manifold vector, $\vec{v}_\theta$, fully encapsulates all of the spatial properties of the array. $d$ is the distance between elements of the array, and $\theta$ is the angle of arrival of an incident plane wave, defined from end-fire, i.e., $\theta=90^\circ$ is a signal from array broadside.

It is common to perform a variable substitution to $\psi$-space, where $\psi=\frac{2\pi}{\lambda} d cos \theta$, and therefore we have:

$$B_\psi \left( \psi \right) = \sum_{n=0}^{N-1}w_n^* e^{j \left( n- \frac{N-1}{2} \right) \psi}$$

and we can more easily see that $\psi$ is simply the phase shift between adjacent elements. The $\frac{N-1}{2}$ term simply references the absolute phase to the physical center of the array.

Notice that this result is the same if we instead first sum each half of the array, then add those results together.

$$B_\psi \left( \psi \right) = \sum_{n=0}^{\frac{N}{2}-1}w_n^* e^{j \left( n- \frac{N-1}{2} \right) \psi}+\sum_{n=\frac{N}{2}}^{N-1}w_n^* e^{j \left( n- \frac{N-1}{2} \right) \psi}$$

The weight vector is a combination of a steering vector that steers the beam in a steered direction, $\psi_S$, using phase adjustments and an amplitude taper that is often applied to reduce sidelobes. Thus, $\left[ \vec{w} \right]_n=a_n e^{j \left( n- \frac{N-1}{2} \right) \psi_S}$, and

$B_\psi \left( \psi_\Delta \right) = e^{j \left( \frac{N-1}{2} \right) \psi_\Delta} \sum_{n=0}^{N-1} a_n e^{-jn\psi_\Delta}$, where $\psi_\Delta=\psi_S-\psi$.

We can clearly see now that the beam pattern, in $\psi$-space, is the spatial equivalent of the discrete time Fourier transform (DTFT) of the array amplitude tapering vector times a linear phase term. The advantage of $\psi$-space is that the beam shape is identical no matter where it is steered, and is only a function of the deviation of the desired target phase from the actual target phase.

Let us now assume an un-tapered, normalized array with $a_n = \frac{1}{N}$. The beam pattern can be easily shown to be the familiar aliased sinc (asinc) function:

$$B_\psi \left( \psi_\Delta \right) = \frac{1}{N} \frac{sin \left( N \frac{\psi_\Delta}{2} \right)}{sin \frac{\psi_\Delta}{2}}$$

This pattern is also known, for monopulse purposes, as the "sum" pattern, as it was obtained by summing all of the elements together. Going forward we will suppress the $\Delta$ subscript and instead use only $\psi$ with the understanding that it represents the deviation of the steered target phase and the actual target phase.

=== Difference Pattern ===
Let us now develop the monopulse "difference" or "del" pattern by dividing the array into two equal halves called subarrays. We could have just as easily derived the sum pattern by first determining the pattern of each subarray individually and adding these two results together. In monopulse practice, this is what is actually done. The reader is left to show that $\vec{v}_\psi \left( \psi \right)$ is conjugate symmetric, so it can be re-written in terms of only its first half, $\vec{v}_{\psi_1} \left( \psi \right)$ using an exchange matrix, $\textbf{J}$, that "flips" this vector.

$$\textbf{J}=\begin{bmatrix} 0 & \cdots & 0 & 1 \\ \vdots & \ddots & 1 & 0 \\ 0 & \cdot^{\cdot^{\cdot}} & \ddots & \vdots \\ 1 & 0 & \cdots & 0 \end{bmatrix}$$

Note that $\textbf{J} \cdot \textbf{J} = \textbf{I}$. Assuming that N is even (we could just as easily develop this using an odd N),

$$\vec{v}_\psi \left( \psi \right)= \begin{bmatrix} \vec{v}_{\psi_1} \left( \psi \right)\\ \cdots\\ \textbf{J} \vec{v}_{\psi_1}^* \left( \psi \right) \end{bmatrix}$$

If we assume that the weight matrix is also conjugate symmetric (a good assumption), then

$$\vec{w} = \begin{bmatrix} \vec{w}_1 \\ \cdots\\ \textbf{J} \vec{w}_1^* \end{bmatrix}$$

and the sum beam pattern can be rewritten as:

$$B_\psi \left( \psi \right)=\Sigma_\psi \left( \psi \right) = \vec{w}^H \vec{v}_{\psi} \left( \psi \right)= \begin{bmatrix} \vec{w}_1^H & \vdots & \vec{w}_1^T \textbf{J} \end{bmatrix} \begin{bmatrix} \vec{v}_{\psi_1} \left( \psi \right)\\ \cdots\\ \textbf{J} \vec{v}_{\psi_1}^* \left( \psi \right) \end{bmatrix} = \vec{w}_1^H \vec{v}_{\psi_1} \left( \psi \right) + \vec{w}_1^T \vec{v}_{\psi_1}^* \left( \psi \right) = 2Re \left[ \vec{w}_1^H \vec{v}_{\psi_1} \left( \psi \right) \right]$$

The difference or "del" pattern can easily be inferred from the sum pattern simply by flipping the sign of the weights for the second half of the array:

$$\Delta_\psi \left( \psi \right) = \begin{bmatrix} \vec{w}_1^H & \vdots & -\vec{w}_1^T \textbf{J} \end{bmatrix} \begin{bmatrix} \vec{v}_{\psi_1} \left( \psi \right)\\ \cdots\\ \textbf{J} \vec{v}_{\psi_1}^* \left( \psi \right) \end{bmatrix} = \vec{w}_1^H \vec{v}_{\psi_1} \left( \psi \right) - \vec{w}_1^T \vec{v}_{\psi_1}^* \left( \psi \right) = 2Im \left[ \vec{w}_1^H \vec{v}_{\psi_1} \left( \psi \right) \right]$$

Again assuming that $a_n = \frac{1}{N}$, the del pattern can be shown to reduce to:

$$\Delta_\psi \left( \psi \right) = \frac{2}{N} Im \left[ \sum_{n=0}^{\frac{N}{2}-1} e^{-j \left( n- \frac{N-1}{2} \right) \psi} \right] = \frac{2}{N} \frac{sin^2 \left( N \frac{\psi}{4} \right)}{sin \frac{\psi}{2}}$$

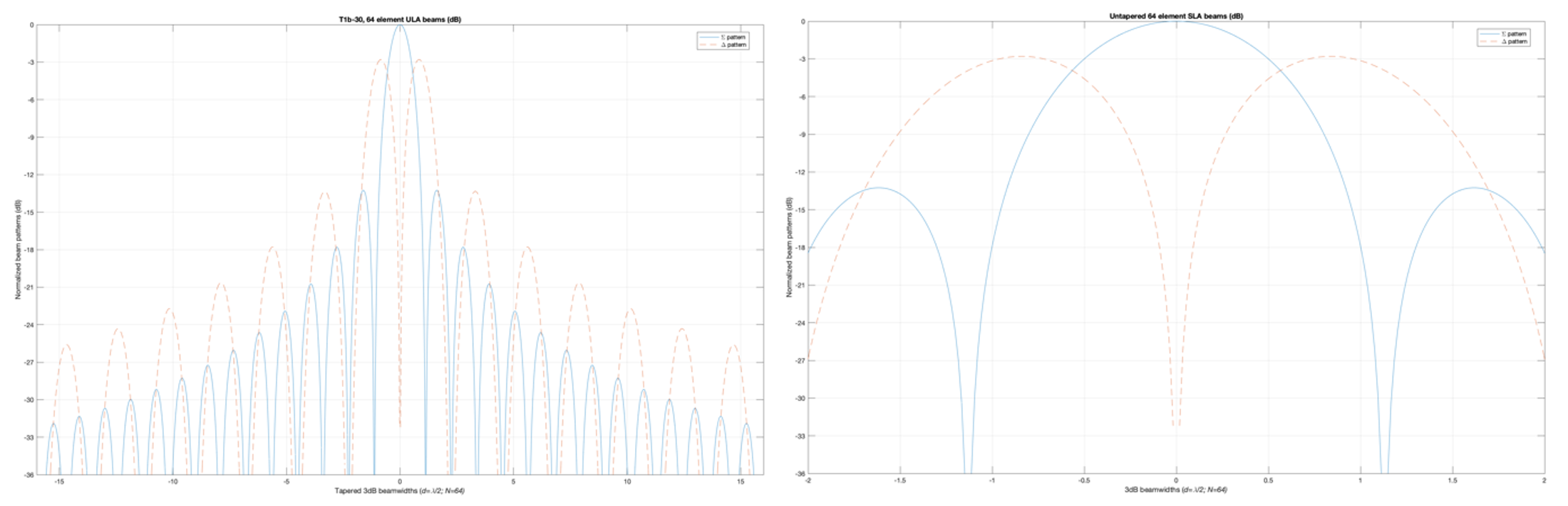
Mono-pulse sum and difference (del) patterns

=== Monopulse Ratio ===
The monopulse ratio is formed as:

$$\frac{\Delta_\psi}{\Sigma_\psi} = \frac{\frac{2}{N} \frac{sin^2 \left( N \frac{\psi}{4} \right)}{sin \frac{\psi}{2}}}{\frac{1}{N} \frac{sin \left( N \frac{\psi}{2} \right)}{sin \frac{\psi}{2}}}=\frac{2sin^2 \left( N \frac{\psi}{4} \right)}{sin \left( N \frac{\psi}{2} \right)}=\frac{1-cos \left( N \frac{\psi}{2} \right)}{sin \left( N \frac{\psi}{2} \right)}=tan \left( N \frac{\psi}{4} \right)$$

One can see that, within the 3dB beam width of the system, the monopulse ratio is almost linear. In fact, for many systems a linear approximation is good enough. One can also note that the monopulse ratio is continuous within the null-to-null beam width, but has asymptotes that occur at the beam nulls. Therefore, the monopulse ratio is only accurate to measure the deviation angle of a target within the main lobe of the system. However, targets detected in the sidelines of a system, if not mitigated, will produce erroneous results regardless.

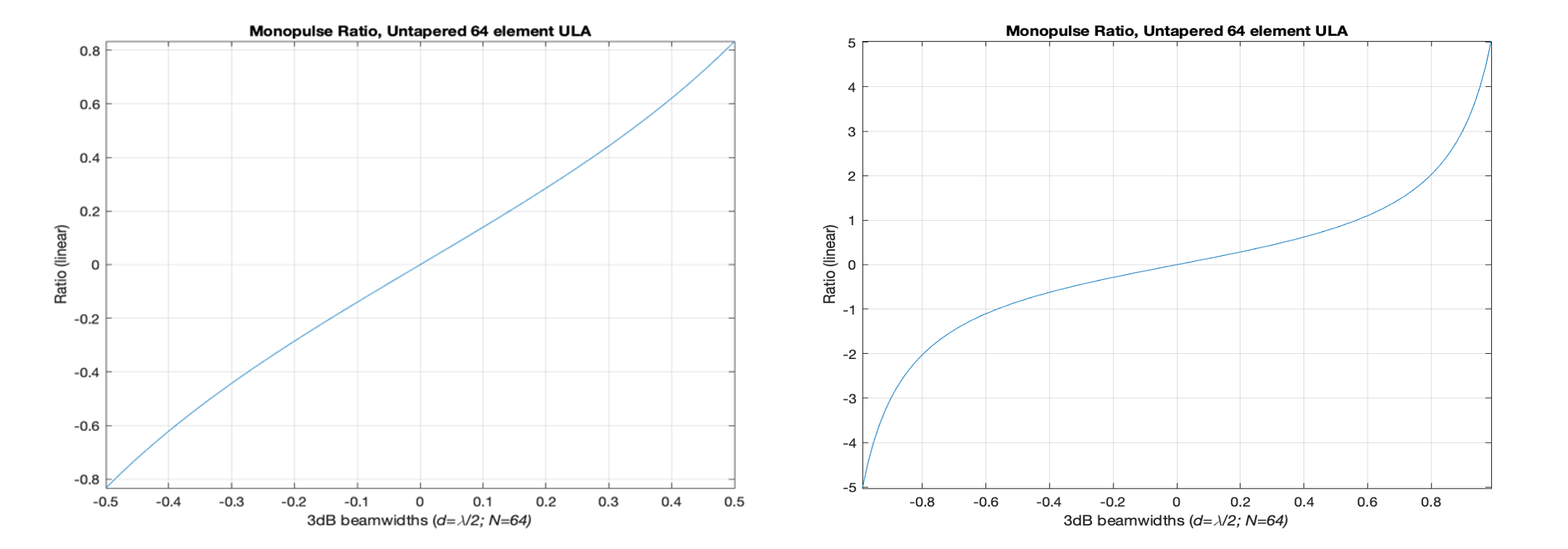
Mono-pulse ratio within 1 beamwidth of the main response axis

== Concept of Operations ==
Before performing monopulse processing, a system must first detect a target, which it does as normal using the sum channel. All of the typical measurements that a non-monopulse system make are done using the sum channel, e.g., range, Doppler, and angle. However, the angle measurement is limited in that the target could be anywhere within the beam width of the sum beam, and therefore the system can only assume that the beam pointing direction is the same as the actual target angle. In reality, of course, the actual target angle and the beam steered angle will differ.

Therefore, a monopulse processor functions by first detecting and measuring the target signal on the sum channel. Then, only as necessary for detected targets, it measures the same signal on the "del" channel, dividing the imaginary part of this result by the real part of the "sum" channel, then converting this ratio to a deviation angle using the relationships:

$$\psi_\Delta=\psi_S-\psi=\frac{4}{N} arctan \left( \frac{\Delta_\psi}{\Sigma_\psi} \right)$$

and

$$\theta=arccos \left( \frac{\left( \psi_S - \psi_\Delta \right) \lambda}{2\pi d} \right)=arccos \left( \frac{\lambda}{2 \pi d} \left( \frac{2\pi}{\lambda} d cos \theta_S - \frac{4}{N} arctan \left(  \frac{\Delta_\psi}{\Sigma_\psi} \right) \right) \right) = arccos \left( cos \theta_S - \frac{2 \lambda}{N \pi d} arctan \left(  \frac{\Delta_\psi}{\Sigma_\psi} \right) \right)$$

This deviation angle, which can be positive or negative, is added to the beam pointing angle to arrive at the more accurate estimate of the actual target bearing angle. Of course, if the array is 2-dimensional, such as a planar array, there are two del channels, one for elevation and one for azimuth, and therefore two monopulse ratios are formed.

== See also ==
- Very-long-baseline interferometry
- Amplitude-comparison monopulse
- Monopulse radar
