= Timeline of British military aviation =

The following timeline of British military aviation covers the military aviation activities of the British Armed Forces from its origins in the 19th century to the present day:

- 1863 - Henry Coxwell demonstrates tethered balloon ascents to British Army personnel at Aldershot
- 1878 - Balloon experiments are conducted at the Royal Arsenal, Woolwich
- 1880 - a balloon section takes part in the Army's manoeuvres at Aldershot
- 1882
  - a balloon section takes part again in the Aldershot manoeuvres
  - The Balloon Equipment Store at Woolwich is moved to the School of Military Engineering at Chatham
- 1882 to 1884 - A balloon factory, depot and training school are established at Chatham
- 1884 - Three balloons, two officers and 15 other ranks take part in the Bechuanaland Expedition
- 1885 Balloons are used during the Sudan expedition
- 1890 The Balloon Section is established as an official unit of the Royal Engineers
- c. 1894 The balloon factory is moved to south Farnborough
- 1899 to 1902 Balloons are used in the South African War
  - Balloons used to direct the fire of the British Artillery at Magersfontein
  - Balloons used to direct the fire of the British Artillery at the Battle of Lombard's Kop
- 1905 The balloon factory is moved to a better site
- 1906 Samuel Franklin Cody is appointed the balloon school's Chief Instructor in Kiting
- 1907 The British Army airship, Nulli Secundus, is completed
- 1908 The first British heavier-than-air military flight takes place when the British Army Aeroplane No. 1 flies
- 1909 The War Office halts all work on aircraft at Farnborough on cost grounds
- 1911 The S. E. 1 and the B.E. 1 are built at Farnborough under the pretext of repairing existing aircraft
  - 1 April The Balloon Section of the Royal Engineers becomes the Air Battalion
- 1912
  - 13 May - The Royal Flying Corps is established from the Air Battalion
- 1914
  - 1 July - The Royal Naval Air Service, having previously broken away from the Royal Flying Corps, is officially recognized
  - 13 August - The first RFC aircraft arrive in France
  - 27 August - The first RNAS aircraft arrive in Ostend
- 1918
  - 1 April - The Royal Air Force is established by merging the Royal Flying Corps and the Royal Naval Air Service
- 1924
  - 1 April - The Royal Air Force establishes its Fleet Air Arm, consisting of RAF units normally embarked on aircraft carriers and fighting ships
- 1937
  - 14 May - The Fleet Air Arm is placed under Admiralty control
- 1940
  - November - The Battle of Taranto, the Fleet Air Arm launched the first all-aircraft naval attack in history
- 1941
  - 21 December - The British Army regains an aviation element as the Glider Pilot Regiment is formed.
- 1942
  - 24 February - The Glider Pilot Regiment is formally inaugurated as part of the Army Air Corps
- 1999
  - 5 October - Joint Helicopter Command is formed
- 2000
  - 1 April - Joint Force Harrier is formed
- 2024
  - May - Joint Aviation Command is formed from the Joint Helicopter Command with the addition of unmanned aerial systems from 32 Regiment, Royal Artillery

== See also ==
- Aviation in the United Kingdom
- Timeline of the Royal Air Force
- History of air traffic control in the United Kingdom
