= History of air traffic control in the United Kingdom =

History of air traffic control coordinated across the entire United Kingdom

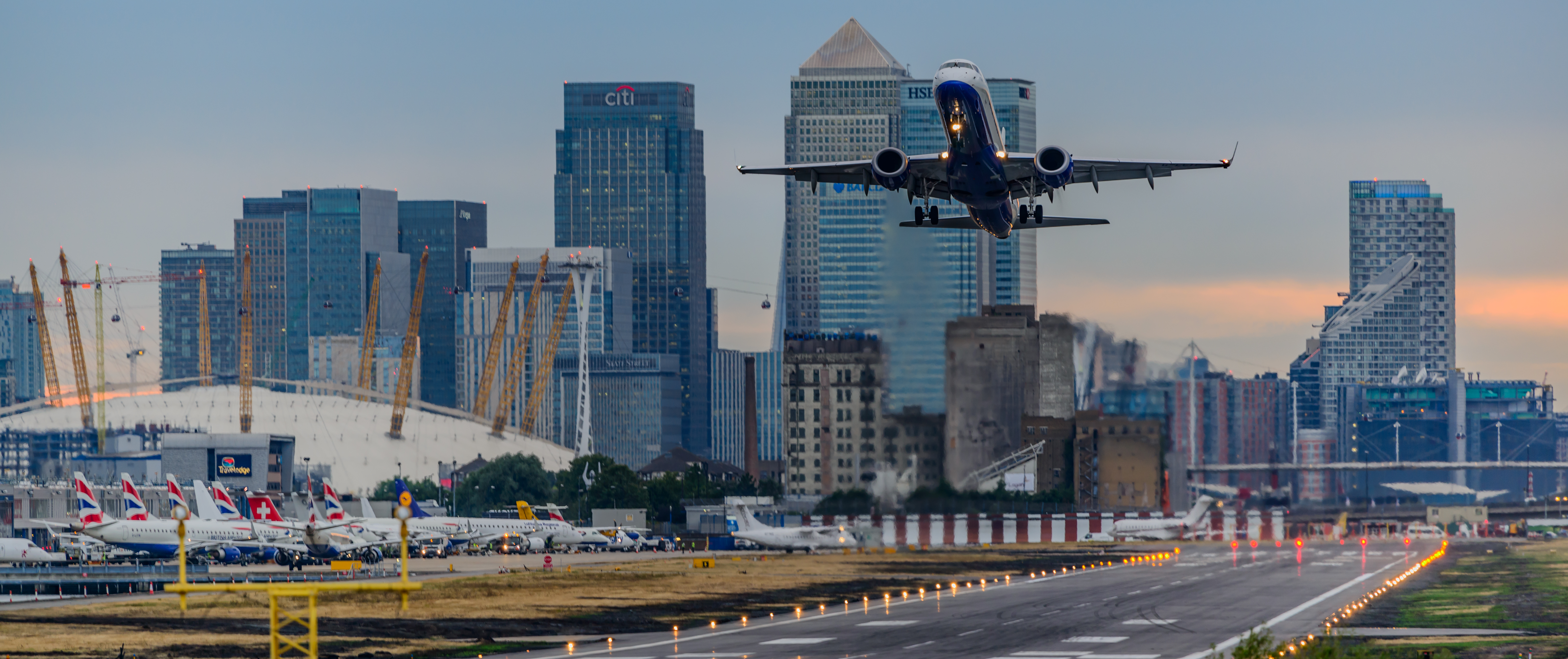
An Embraer E190 of BA CityFlyer at London City Airport in September 2016; the airport began in May 1987, with two ILS, one DME and one NDB, with a steep ILS glide slope

The history of air traffic control in the United Kingdom began in the late 1950s, and early 1960s, when an integrated and coordinated system began, once radar had become sufficiently advanced to allow this.

== London Airport ==
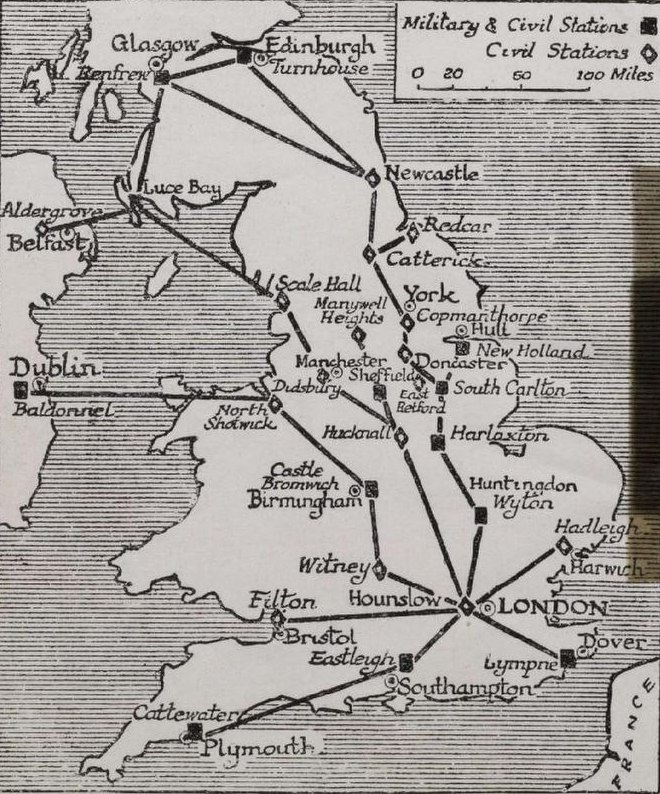
Early routes in 1919

On 15 July 1919, the world's first commercial flight occurred, when Jerry Shaw (1892-1977) piloted a de Havilland DH.9 for Aircraft Transport and Travel from Hendon to Le Bourget airfield in Paris. The pilot did not have a passport. The flight been chartered by Major Pilkington, of Pilkington Glass, who paid £50 to France, and £50 back. He had missed his boat for an important business meeting.

The world's first scheduled flight was from Hounslow Heath Aerodrome to France, on 24 August 1919, in a former wartime DH.4A, piloted by Captain Bill Lawford, with one passenger, Mr Stevenson-Reece.

Jimmy Jeffs was the world's first air traffic controller at London Airport on 22 February 1922. The Mayday callsign originated at London Airport in 1921.

In 1922 the first direction of aircraft was calculated by a goniometer, called Wireless Position Finding.

The 1922 Picardie mid-air collision started the need for defined air routes.

The Air Navigation (Consolidation) Order 1923, from 1 January 1924 stipulated that a journey log book had to be kept by all aircraft in Great Britain and Northern Ireland. Smoking was prohibited from aircraft over the UK.

From 1928, radio signals from Croydon, Pulham St Mary in Norfolk and Lymm in Kent triangulated the position of aircraft; a similar system was set up by Germany in 1940, known as the Battle of the Beams.

In the early 1930s, pilots were ordered to fly at a high altitude over large zoos, so as not to cause the animals to stampede, and to fly at least 2,000 ft over large sporting events, and historic buildings such as cathedrals.

On 19 November 1933, the first form of ATC began in the London Zone, with a controlled zone, but no radar

== Development of radar ==
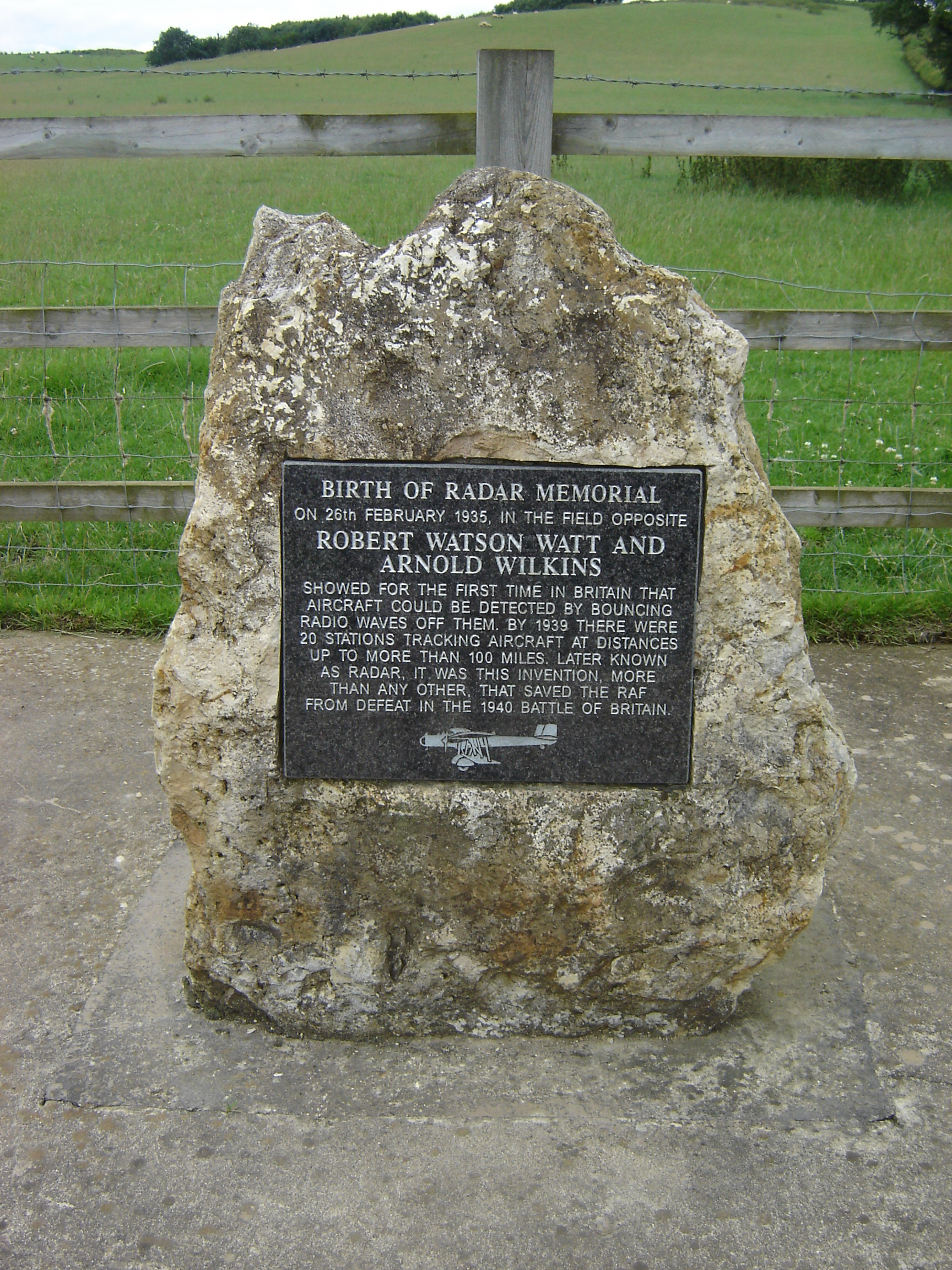
Memorial to the 1935 Daventry Experiment, funded by Qinetiq (of the Malvern Hills Science Park), in October 2001

On the evening of 25 February 1935 at Stowe Nine Churches (Upper Stowe) in Northamptonshire, the so-called Daventry experiment took place with Robert Watson-Watt to prove that radar detection of aircraft was possible. Other subsequent technology needed for the wide deployment of radar was coordinated by Sir Edward Fennessy, of 60 Group and Sir Raymund Hart in planning Filter Rooms, at RAF Bawdsey in Suffolk.

The first four radar stations were at Dover in July 1937, Canewdon in August 1937, followed by Great Bromley, and Dunkirk, Kent, with 358-feet masts, fabricated by J. L. Eve Construction.

The WAAF was formed on 28 June 1939. Many women took part in air traffic control for the Battle of Britain, from 20 September 1939, and women up to age of 50 could be radar plotters.

On 6 September 1939 a fault with the Canewdon CH station caused the radar to identify RAF aircraft as hostile. Hurricanes of 56 Sqn and Spitfires of 74 Sqn were dispatched, with the Spitfires of 74 Sqn mistaking 56 Sqn for enemy Bf 109 aircraft. Frank Rose and Pilot Officer Montague Hulton-Harrop are both shot down, in Hurricanes, with Hulton-Harrop killed by John Freeborn, which was the first aircraft destroyed by a Spitfire, and Freeborn was court-martialled. This became known as the Battle of Barking Creek.

On the night of 22 July 1940 a Dornier Do 17, of Kampfgeschwader 3 piloted by Leutnant Bruno Kahlfuss, became the first aircraft in aviation history to be shot down by an AI radar-equipped aircraft near Selsey, by a Bristol Blenheim L6836 with Mk 4 radar. The Blenheim was from the Fighter Interception at RAF Tangmere, under Peter Chamberlain, guided from the CH station at Poling, West Sussex. It has been disputed, due to being at night, if it was a German aircraft, or not. The AI radar operator was Sergeant Reginald Harry Leyland, subsequently commissioned in March 1943. The four German crew were apparently later rescued, although wounded, by a Heinkel He 59 operating from Schellingwoude.

Ground-controlled interception (GCI) was first developed in the UK during the early part of WWII, at RAF Sopley in Hampshire, close to Bournemouth. Development of the system began in October 1940, and the first ground-controlled interception took place on 1 January 1941 with the Bristol Beaufighter at RAF Middle Wallop, and the call sign Starlight.

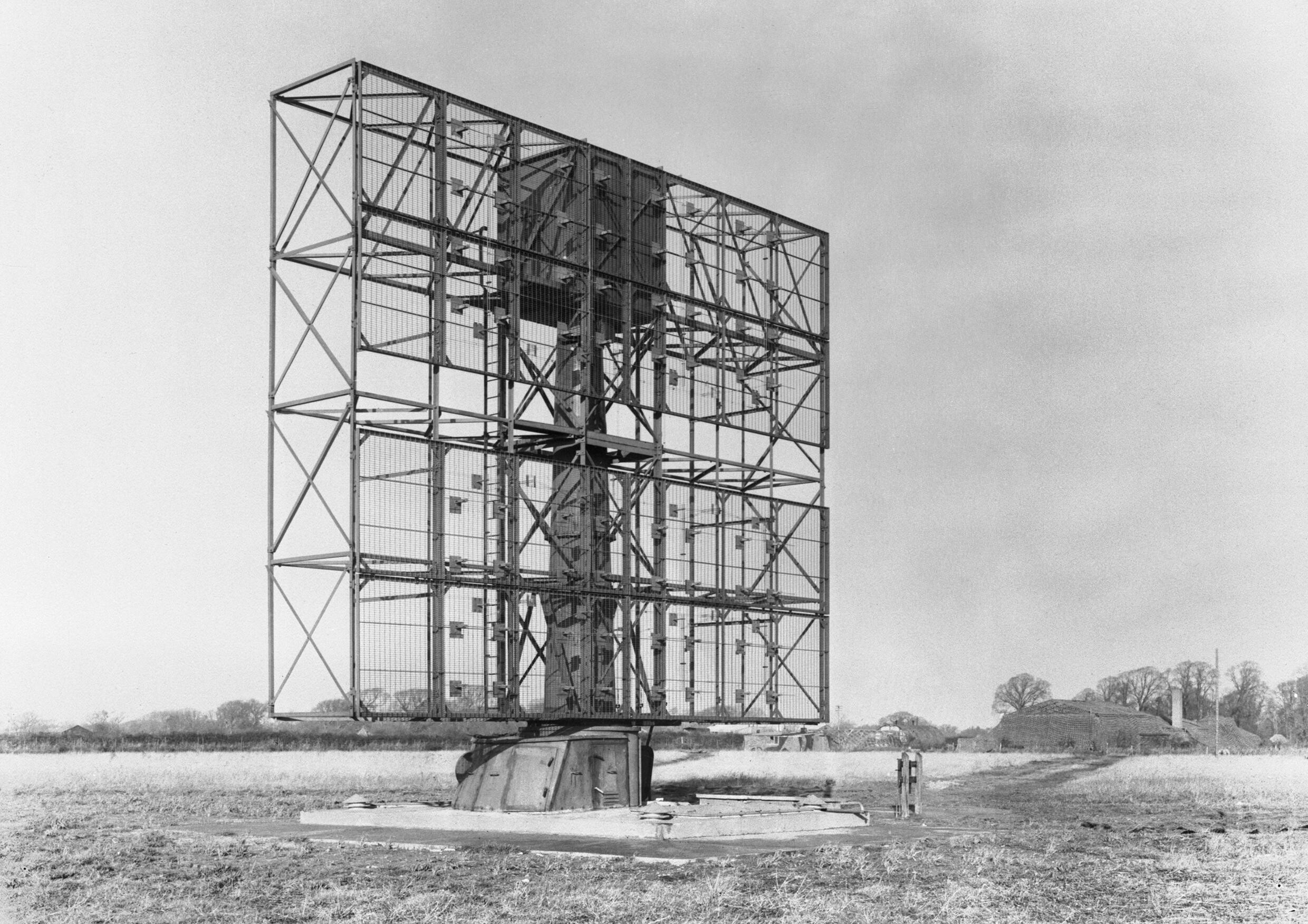
AMES Type 7

The interception was enabled by 604 Squadron. The Beaufighter R2098 NG-H, equipped with the AI Mark IV radar, made the first interception with aircraft interception (AI) radar at 00.35 on 20 November 1940, thanks to radar operator Sgt John Phillipson. The interception destroyed a Junkers Ju 88A, B3-YL, of III./KG 54 from Évreux-Fauville Air Base. Birmingham had been heavily bombed that night by 439 German aircraft, guided by KG 100; the Ju 88 pilot Unteroffizier Franz Sondermeier bailed out.

The Beaufighter had four Hispano-Suiza HS.404 20mm cannon in the nose of the aircraft (the Messerschmitt Bf 109 had one), so if any enemy aircraft could be caught at close range, by its AI radar, few German aircraft would survive. Although the rate of Luftwaffe combat losses, detected by AI radar, markedly increased throughout the first half of 1941, only three German bombers destroyed over Britain in February 1941, around 50 in April and 102 in May. The Luftwaffe campaign would abruptly stop in the second week of May 1941.

From late 1941, GCI would be carried out by the AMES Type 7 radar, which provided a 360 degrees view; such radar was developed at the Telecommunications Research Establishment (TRE).

The other GCI units were at Orby in east Lincolnshire, Waldringfield in east Suffolk, Willesborough in Kent next to the present M20, Durrington, West Sussex and Avebury, by end of January 1941, being fitted from June 1941 with the AMES Type 7.

Richard Gray (radio engineer) (1902-99) of the TRE at Malvern had heard of the innovative work on GCA at MIT, with X band radar, and immediately investigated, and noted the large significance of the work to the needs of the RAF. He flew the inventor Luis Walter Alvarez across the Atlantic, who worked with the RAF in the summer of 1943.

The first AI-radar equipped Beaufighters began operations on 17 September 1940, with 29 Sqn at RAF Wellingore in Lincolnshire, where the squadron was based from 8 July 1940 to 27 April 1941.

Over Essen on 8 March 1942, the first electronic navigation of Bomber Command began, with 211 aircraft. The Gee navigation system transmitted from stations at Daventry, Stenigot and Ventnor.

The Decca Navigator System in the last year of the war had a Master Station at Buntingford, with three slave stations, red, green and purple at Stoke Holy Cross in Norfolk, East Hoathley in Sussex, and Wormleighton in Warwickshire.

Precision Approach Radar began around 1944, being tested at Hinton-in-the-Hedges Airfield, and RAF Honiley, known as AN/MPN-1.

SCS-51 was brought to the UK in 1944 by the USAAF, to help their bombers land in bad weather. It was tested by a Boeing aircraft at RAF Defford. As part of the Telecommunications Flying Unit, on 16 January 1945 at RAF Defford in Worcestershire, Boeing 247 DZ203 made the first automatic approach and landing, with the SCS-51 system, following from earlier tests.

After the war BEA planned to navigate its aircraft with the GEE system, across Scotland and Northern Ireland.

In February 1946 there was an international conference at the headquarters of RAF Transport Command, that discussed new radar, orbit meters for orbits, and the Rebecca/Eureka transponding radar.

The Convention on International Civil Aviation came into effect in April 1947, with five FIRs - Northern Scottish, from RAF Kinloss, Central Scottish, from Prestwick, Shannon, South Western, from RAF Llandow, Northern from Preston, and South Eastern from Uxbridge.

On Thursday 4 September 1947, a new system for Scotland was announced, which was to begin on 1 October 1947, with two FIRs

- Northern - Inverness
- Southern - Prestwick

SCS-51 was installed on 1 July 1947, a GCA system.

The 1948 Northwood mid-air collision would result in vertical separation, of aircraft, being increased from 500ft to 1,000ft

== Integration ==
ILS was introduced on 1 March 1950, replacing SBA, or Standard Beam Approach. The SBA system at Heathrow in the 1940s was SCS-51 (being invented in the US). From 1 December 1947, in the MCA over southern England, in IFR conditions, a flight plan had to be submitted beforehand to Uxbridge Control Centre, but by November 1947, there were only 29 teleprinter operators, whereas 80 were needed.

Stansted had the Civil Aviation Flying Unit, from 1950. The discipline of holding patterns was established at Stansted, and at Bournemouth, and conducted flights to calibrate VOR-DME transmitters.

From 14 April 1950 the ATC centre at Raigmore moved to Prestwick; Raigmore had looked after the Northern Scottish FIR, which merged with the Central Scottish FIR.

In early 1950, there was an international discussion - whether to go with the British Decca system (long wave) or the VOR DME (VHF) system of the US.

Most of the UK ILS was the STAN 37/38 system, made by STC.

In July 1952 Gatwick was approved as a 'bad weather alternative' to Heathrow. Sir Eric Millbourn's October 1957 report recommended opening Gatwick. Gatwick later opened on 9 June 1958.

The first air traffic building at Heathrow was built by Taylor Woodrow, who also built the first terminal buildings. The Southern Air Traffic Control Centre opened, on the north-west edge of Heathrow, in April 1955. It had moved from RAF Uxbridge. In 1959 SATCC was handling 200 commercial jet aircraft per week, with 600 per week in 1960. A Ferranti Hermes computer was added to SATCC in 1967, after a Ferranti Mercury computer had been added in 1960.

In September 1956 IATA held their 12th annual conference at the Usher Hall in Edinburgh; Juan Trippe attended. Sir William Hildred was the Director-General of IATA until 1966.

On Wednesday 18 June 1958, a £5 million plan for coordinating air traffic control was announced. Four new radar centres would be built; previous to this, ATC personnel received aircraft positional information over the radio from pilots, not from any radar. The UK Air Traffic Service began in September 1959; it controlled air movements above 25,000 ft.

The USA had created its Federal Aviation Administration (FAA) also in 1958.

In February 1959, the ICAO chose VOR-DMET. Commonwealth countries had all voted for the British Decca system, everyone else voted for VOR-DMET.

In late 1959, the UK was divided into three FIRs for upper airspace, and civilian and military radar would be shared.

Experiments took place during 1960 for one radar system to look after civilian and military flights over 25,000 ft. This was the height of the Cold War, and there may have been an intrinsic security purpose to this combined system. From 1961 the combined civil-military system began, known as Joint Air Traffic Control Radar Units.

Instrument flight rules applied at Heathrow from 1 March 1961; previously it had only applied in bad weather.

=== Routes ===
The first longer-range 750 kW radar opened at London Airport on 22 February 1950, with the first airway expected to start from early June 1950; it could detect four-engined aircraft at 130 miles (210 km), at 20,000 ft, and at 90 miles (140 km), at 10,000 ft. A trial system had begun in May 1949. It was known as London Radar, and was the first of its type in the world. London Radar had two AN/CPS-1 sets, and a Marconi S-232 50 cm radar, with a 70-mile (110 km) range.

Until better electronics had been installed, ground-control approaches at airports, in bad weather, were the scenes of a series of terrible accidents in the 1950s.

Upper airspace routes, known as airways, were created in the early 1950s.

In the first phase of airways

- Green One opened on 1 August 1950, from the Irish Sea - Strumble Head - Bristol - London.; it was 10 miles (16 km) wide, 5,000 to 11,000 ft

In the second phase of airways on 15 February 1951

- Green One, was extended eastwards via North Foreland to a point 21 miles (34 km) off the east coast, at Koksijde (Coxyde), in Belgium, for London to Brussels traffic
- Amber One, Daventry - Dunsfold - Dieppe - Paris, later extended to Manchester
- Amber Two Paris - Abbeville - Brookmans Park - Daventry
- Red One, Dunsfold - North Foreland - Amsterdam
- Blue One, Bletchley - Watford - Crowborough
- Red Two, Woodley - Epsom - Kent

In the third phase of airways, around June 1951

- Amber One was extended northwards via Manchester and Liverpool to Prestwick and Glasgow
- Green Two, Dublin - Liverpool - north west Europe
- Red Three, Liverpool - Isle Man - Belfast
- Blue Two, Belfast - Prestwick - Glasgow

Norway, Sweden and the US Zone of Germany also had airways, but the UK was the furthest in development. The rest of Europe was expected to have airways by 1 September 1952.

New airways were added in 1957 and 1958, in anticipation of better radar units, with two from Cap Gris-Nez to Kent.

Amber One had beacons at New Galloway and Stonehouse, South Lanarkshire; another beacon further south was Dean Cross, between Plumbland and Gilcrux in north-west Cumbria.

== Coordinating organisation ==
On Monday 10 December 1962, Julian Amery, the Minister for Aviation, announced the new National Air Traffic Control Services, with a central controller. Military air traffic control was controlled by the Military Air Traffic Organisation.

The Air Traffic Control Board, chaired by Sir Frederick Brundrett from 1959 to 1974, looked into Britain's airspace navigation.

The headquarters of Britain's air traffic control in December 1962 was to be Woburn Place in central London. Eight civilian radar sites were to open during 1963, including the former RAF Kilchiaran on the Isle of Islay, in the Inner Hebrides, and the former RAF Winkleigh in central Devon.

The precision approach radar SLA-3C was ordered from STC in 1962 for civilian airports; the SLA-3B had previously been ordered for military purposes. 12 more SLA-3C sets were ordered for the RAF in October 1963, costing £750,000.

In 1963, the RAF ordered the Plessey AR-1 (an airport surveillance radar or ASR) for its terminal approach radar, a 75-mile (121 km) range.

From 1 July 1965, all new aircraft for British airlines had to be fitted with a flight recorder. BEA chose the Plessey PV710. From 9 November 1965, the ICAO had an aviation safety conference in Montreal. Discussions were about the compulsory fitting of crash-proof air data recorders. BOAC had Epsilon recorders fitted from 1966.

The Mediator system was announced on 8 July 1965. In 1967, Mediator was to cost £25 million. Two similar air traffic hubs would be built, at West Drayton and Preston, but only West Drayton was eventually built as a hub. Mediator worked by building a large mathematical model of aircraft movements, so needed enough computing capacity.

The new West Drayton building was designed by GMW Architects. The new centre was first shown to public on 18 May 1966, being mostly designed by Plessey since around 1956. The London Terminal Control Centre at RAF West Drayton opened in November 1966, but only received radar coverage in 1971; previous to that, Southern Radar had been headquartered at RAF Sopley in Hampshire from 1959.

West Drayton opened with a Myriad system for the military computer. The £1.2 million Myriad computer was ordered in 1966, to begin operating in 1969 as a flight plan processing system.

An international conference was held at the IEE in London in March 1967, to discuss the latest developments. Computer-assisted approach sequencing was developed by the RRE in the late 1960s, for the two stacks over Garston and Epsom. The calculations required to place aircraft in the two stacks had to have computer calculations.

Civil aviation stopped GEE radars in 1960; the RAF and rescue helicopters continued until 18 April 1969, when GEE was switched off.

After the Ariana Afghan Airlines Flight 701 incident on 5 January 1969, at Gatwick, rules on foreign aircraft were changed. Previously, British aircraft were not allowed to land if runway visual range was less than 600 m (2,000 feet); from September 1969 this applied to all aircraft. Calibration research had been carried out at RAE Bedford (Thurleigh).

The Edwards Committee, of Sir Ronald Edwards, published on 2 May 1969, recommended the formation of the CAA.

The first 747 flew into Heathrow on Monday 12 January 1970, piloted by Jesse Tranter of Pan-Am.

The Mediator system started on 1 February 1971 at West Drayton, with the full computer system beginning in the mid-1970s, planned for March 1972. Due to many near-misses, £25 million of IBM computers were ordered in June 1972. The IBM 9020D was installed in August 1974. The IBM 9020D entered service in early 1975. The earlier computer remained for military flights, being developed by Plessey. The former computer could not process both civilian and military flight plans. Later in July 1987, This Week made a documentary about the West Drayton computer system.

In 1962, the new Mediator system had been expected by 1967. There were difficulties with the Radar Data Processing System. The Plessey 090 computer was ordered, but it was acknowledged that 1960s-vintage computers would be painfully obsolete within years.

NATCS, the coordinating organisation, became NATS in April 1972, when it became part of the CAA. Computer flight plans were implemented in 1975.

From 12 am Friday 26 April 1974, the Lichfield and Hawarden radar sectors were moved from Preston to London; so that London and Prestwick would become the two main radar hubs in the UK.

Manchester Airport became the site of the £2 million northern radar centre in March 1975.

== Near misses ==
On Tuesday 11 November 1969, BOAC VC-10 'G-ASGD' had a near miss with a Boeing 727.

By January 1977 all British-registered airliners had to have a ground proximity warning system fitted. Ground proximity radar was invented by Canadian C. Donald Bateman in the late 1960s.

In June 1986, near Iceland, a BA 747, from Heathrow to Seattle with 375 passengers, came within 50 feet at 33,000ft of a Scandinavian Airlines DC-8 from Greenland to Copenhagen, with 186 passengers.

In 1988 a 'Conflict Alert' system was installed at West Drayton, after a near miss, over Kent. On Saturday 6 February 1988, at 11.38am, a Balkan Bulgarian Airlines Tupolev Tu-154 'LZ-BTE' was at 18,000 ft, in a stack over Lydd, waiting to approach Gatwick. ATC told the Bulgarian Tu-154 from Sofia with Captain Nikolai Kardjilov and co-pilot Captain Gamel Alexandrov, to descend to 11,000ft, to begin the approach to Gatwick. As the Tu-154 began to descend, worryingly in front, a BA TriStar 'G-BBAH' crossed the Tu-154's path, being Flight BA 305 from France to Heathrow, with 327 passengers piloted by Captain Clive Richardson, who pulled the nose of the TriStar up, and to the right, telling his startled passengers, that they had been in 'a very close shave'. On the screen at West Drayton, the two 'blips' had 'merged'. The BA pilot had seen the Tu-154 at around 300 m (980 feet), and after taking drastic avoidance measures, had missed the Tu-154 by only around 100 ft (30 m).

The near miss, over Kent, was discussed in parliament on Monday 8 February 1988, with Norman Tebbit, himself a former 1960s BOAC pilot, and Terry Dicks, the local Conservative MP for Heathrow The AAIB report in November 1988 found that the two aircraft were between 70 and 400 m (230 and 1,310 ft); the two aircraft should have been 5 miles (8.0 km) apart. Sir Robert McCrindle was chairman from 1980-92 of the All-Party Parliamentary Aviation Committee. Conservative MP Neville Trotter was also alarmed by near misses.

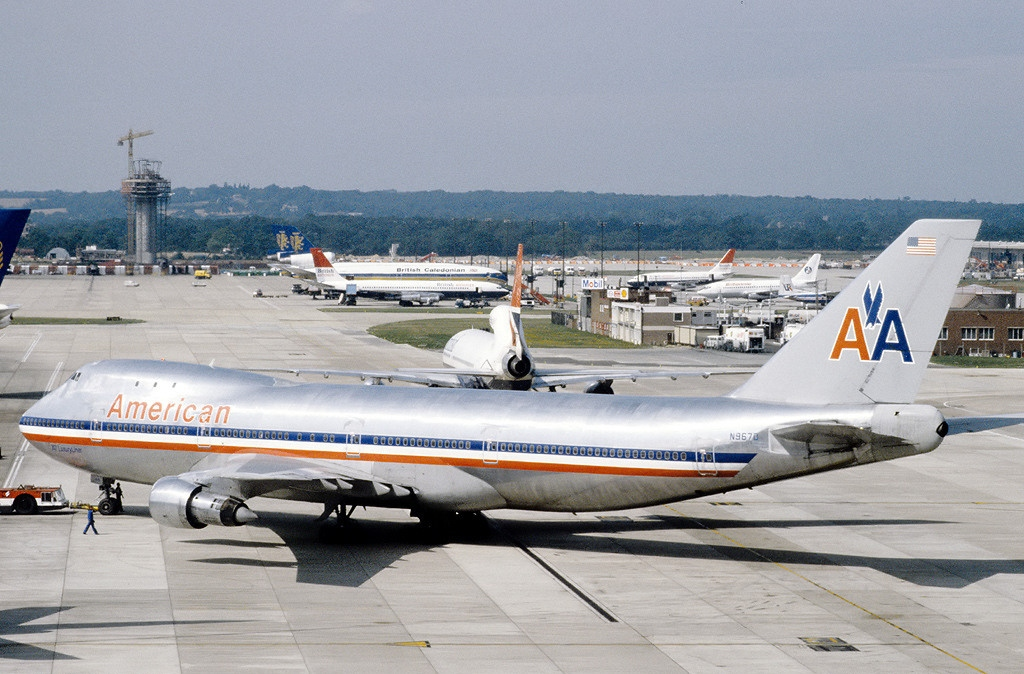
8 August 1982 at Gatwick, with the ATC tower under construction. Construction of the tower section started on Monday November 30 1981, being approved in February 1981. It was the UK's first stalk-mounted ATC tower. The main section was built in five days continuously by the slip form method, by Trentham, up to 14 inches per hour. The glass was replaced in August 1983.It planned to open in August 1984, bring fitted with a £500,000 RACAL Avionics ASMI-18X Ground Movement Radar on the top, in March 1984, being 137 ft. There were 130,000 aircraft movements per year, and opened on June 6 1984. The £6m tower was officially opened September 4 1984 by Princess Michael of Kent. The previous tower was built in 1958.

On Monday 15 February 1988 Horizon broadcast a documentary, 'Struggling for Control', about ATC operational limitations in the UK; it featured Brymon Airways Flight 204 in a Twin Otter from Birmingham to Gatwick at 10.20am, flying through the Daventry sector. At Aylesbury the pilot entered the London Terminal Manoeuvring Area (LTMA), being guided at West Drayton by TMA North then TMA South, passing the Midhurst radio marker, making contact with Gatwick Approach then finally Gatwick Visual. The documentary looked at the Joint Airmiss Working Group, and an incident on 23 April 1987 at 9.56am with Concorde Flight BA 1 from Heathrow to JFK, American Airlines Flight AA 51 DC-10 from Gatwick, and Brymon Flight 204 at 8,000ft. The Concorde and the American Airlines pilots spoke to West Drayton on the same frequency. A request for the DC-10 to climb was heard by the Concorde pilot, so Concorde mistakenly climbed, heading towards the Brymon Twin Otter. The West Drayton controller saw Concorde approaching, so asked the Concorde pilot for his height, with time in short supply.

In May 1988 the IPCS union claimed that NATS was giving misleading figures on near misses.

Most RAF airfields were fitted with the Racal Avionics DN811 ILS system, by the 1980s.

From the 1980s, ILS was trialled at main airports by the microwave landing system (MLS) as it was thought to be better for bad weather. In April 1978 the ICAO decided to go with a US-Australian system (Time Reference Scanning Beam), than the Doppler Microwave Landing System, of Plessey. ILS had been operating since 1949, and was World War II technology. The MLS allowed various flight paths, whereas ILS only allowed one. MLS was trialled over 12 months, at Stansted, in 1983. It was fitted onto a Hawker Siddeley HS 748 test aircraft, of the CAA. MLS was fitted to runway 28R (called 27R from July 1987, due to movement of the Earth's magnetic field), at Heathrow from November 1986, but was not intended to be implemented across the country until around 1996. Cardiff Airport had MLS, made by Textron Systems next installed, in July 1990, and Aberdeen in July 1991. But by 1994, the FAA had lost interest in MLS, instead choosing satellite-guidance.

== New computers ==
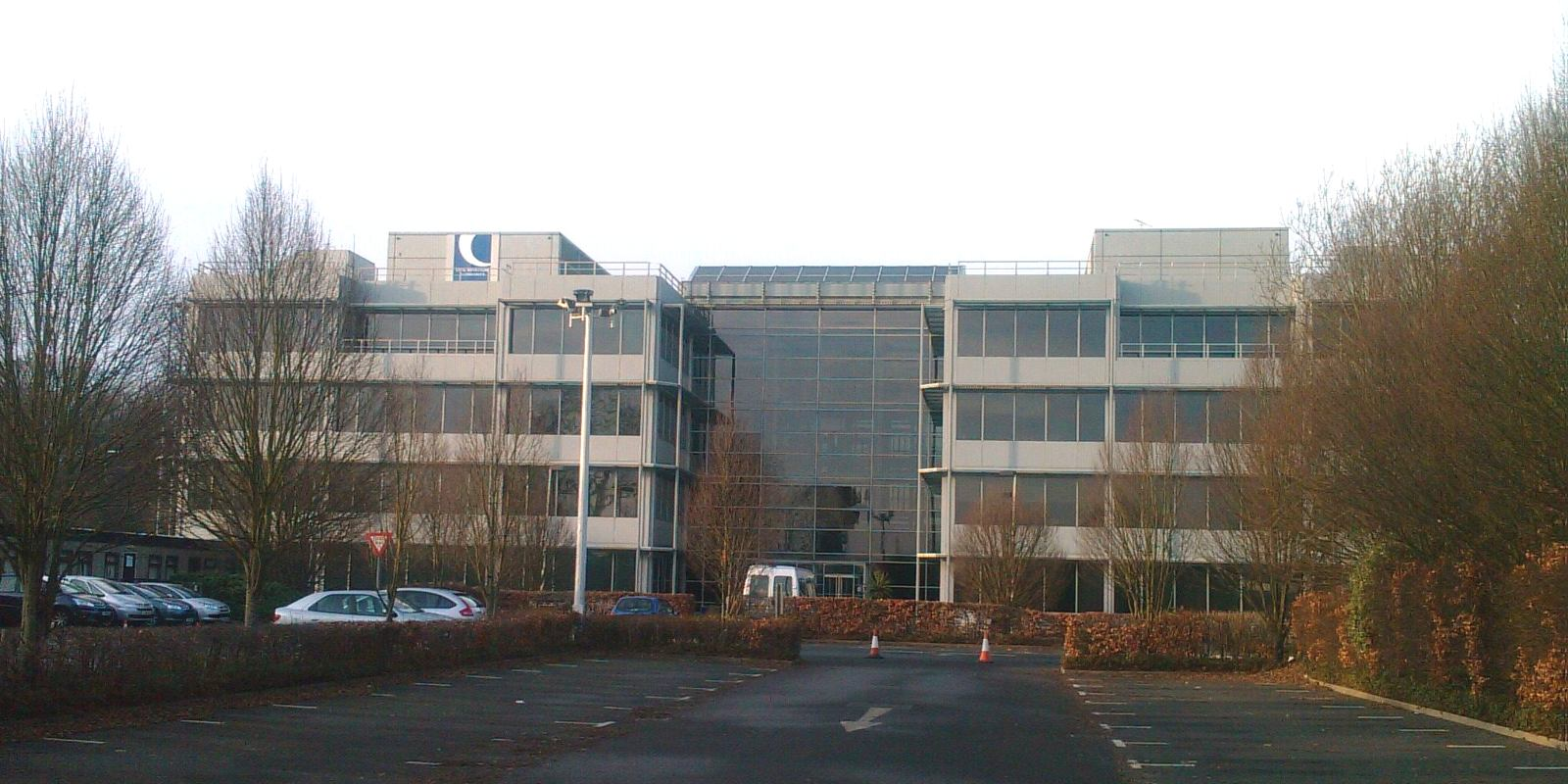
Aviation House in January 2009

The CAA moved to a new £23 million headquarters, Aviation House, at Gatwick in June 1988.

In August 1988, 6,000 square miles (16,000 km^{2}) of military flight areas were opened to civilian flights to ease air traffic.

On Friday 9 September 1988 at 8 am, the West Drayton computer failed for six hours

In October 1988, BAA wanted to take over ATC in Scotland by April 1989.

On 14 October 1988, the CAA announced a £600 million plan to replace the West Drayton site by 1996. In 1988, although NATS was a joint 50-50 civil-military, 80% of the flights were civil. HQ Military Air Traffic Operations had been at Hillingdon House from 1965. In March 1989 there were only 285 qualified controllers at West Drayton, when there should have been 410.

At London in 1990, a £22 million IBM 4381 computer (IBM 370 architecture) replaced an ageing IBM 9020, which was three IBM 360/65 computers; IBM 9020 was installed around 1974. The Princess Royal opened the new computer on 18 June 1990. London looked after the sectors of Daventry, Pole Hill - Northern England, Bristol - Strumble Head, Irish Sea, Cardiff, Dover - Lydd, Clacton, North Sea and Hurn - Seaford - Worthing. The new Wedt Drayton computer was known as 'Host'.

The new computer broke down for hour and half on Saturday 28 July 1990.

American F-111 aircraft were adapting smaller British airports, for 'practice' attacks. An incident, in November 1989, with four F-111s at Inverness Airport narrowly missed a Dan Air BAC 1-11 by 250 feet.

Two RAF Tornado aircraft, from RAF Leeming, 'sandwiched' a Dan Air Boeing 737, on the evening of Wednesday 10 October 1990 over Tyneside at 14,000 ft, flying from Newcastle to Kos.

On the evening of Monday 30 March 1992, at the former RAF Rhoose in Wales, now Cardiff Airport, an 24 year old untrained passenger, Alan Anderson, was guided by the ATC to land the aircraft, a SOCATA Rallye Minerva. The 63 year old pilot, Les Rhoades, had had a heart attack at 2,000 ft, and slumped in his seat. Alan flew the aircraft for 22 minutes, alongside a Piper Warrior, over Penarth, of 26 year old flying instructor Robert Legge. On landing, Alan had to be sedated for deep shock.

By 1992, controllers earned £33,000.

From 1992 to 1994, the approach radar controllers at Heathrow, Gatwick and Stansted were moved to a new facility at West Drayton. Stansted had 31 controllers. Heathrow and Gatwick controllers moved on 22 October 1993.

On Sunday 12 September 1993, Equinox broadcast a documentary 'Your Flight in Their Hands'.

In October 1993, the Future Air Navigation System was being considered, which worked with military satellites.

On Wednesday 20 October 1993, an Air Malta Boeing 737 Flight KM 144, from Malta with 95 passengers, mistakenly landed on a taxiway at Gatwick.

In May 1994 the government decided to make NATS a private company.

== New buildings ==
A £200 million En Route Centre (NERC) was to be built in the early 1990s. Planning began for the new £200 million site on a former Bursledon Brickworks at Swanwick, in September 1990. Work began in March 1991, 41,000 m^{2} (440,000 sq ft), built by Bovis Construction The Swanwick project manager was John Barrett of EMI. By 1992 it was to cost £350 million.

In the new Swanwick centre, the American computer would not connect to the British radar in January 1996. Automatic Dependent Surveillance was being tested in February 1996 at the CAA research centre in Bournemouth.

Logica ran the computer system at Swanwick. The 250-screen computer system was handed over on Monday 6 April 1998. The computer system cost £163 million. There were 1,200 software errors in radar system.

Aberdeen ATC took over the southern North Sea in the late 1990s from Stansted.

On Friday 28 April 2000 a BA 747 from Tokyo, with 381 passengers, approached the southern runway (09R) at Heathrow, where a British Midland Airbus A321 for Brussels, with 89 passengers, was cleared for take-off, and missed by 112 feet. Heathrow had 1,340 take-offs and landings per day in 2000.

On Saturday 17 June 2000, at 10am, the West Drayton computer crashed.

On Tuesday 27 March 2001, around half of NATS was sold to The Airline Group.

On 19 April 2001 the UK implemented the reduced vertical separation minima (RVSM) from 2,000 to 1,000ft.

In January 2002, the total number of flights was reduced by 25% whilst the system was cautiously introduced, gradually.

The London Area Control Centre at West Drayton moved to Swanwick, Hampshire at 2.30am on Sunday 27 January 2002, when 29-year-old controller Sarah Harris guided an Airtours International Flight AIH 550 from Gran Canaria Airport at Las Palmas safely into Birmingham Airport. Swanwick had been hoped to open in 1996 and to cost £350 million. Swanwick oversaw flights above 20,000 feet, excluding those around Manchester under 21,000 feet and around South East England under 24,500 feet.

A KLM Cityhopper, with 35 people from Holland to Bristol, was unintentionally directed over an Army firing range, within the distance of heavy artillery. Only when military radar noticed the aircraft, firing on the range was suspended, until the aircraft had flown over.

In September 2004 at 6 am, the computer failed at West Drayton, for one hour.

Swanwick was intended to replace two sites at West Drayton and Manchester (at Manchester Airport), but the West Drayton centre remained open to oversee London and South East England, and was planned to close in 2007; it closed on 23 November 2007 when around 500 staff moved to Swanwick. NATS also have a technical centre in Whiteley. The RAF 78 Sqn moved to Swanwick from January 2008. Swanwick receives radar information from nine radar sites.

Manchester closed in 2010, which was the Manchester Area Control Centre. The new Prestwick site, in Ayrshire, in 2010 had 800 workers, with 240 workstations. Electronic flight strips begin in 2011. The RAF unit moved from Prestwick to Swanwick in December 2012.

== Controllers ==
ATC personnel were represented by the Institution of Professional Civil Servants, which became Institution of Professionals, Managers and Specialists in 1989.

There was industrial action by Britain's 850 ATC assistants, who operated the ATC computer, from late August 1977, by the CPSA. Ken Thomas was head of the CPSA, and Bill McCall the head of the IPCS. The CPSA wanted a 17% pay rise, which the CAA rejected. This also affected the North Atlantic route. Airline pilots had to follow fixed tracks, and not tracks chosen according to the wind direction. This added about 35 minutes to each flight, additionally 2,000 gallons in fuel. Two-fifths of flights at Heathrow were affected, resulting in delays from a half-hour to three hours. The CPSA then picketed the West Drayton site, to stop fuel supplies entering. The RAF brought 12 military petrol tankers, supported by 60 police, to West Drayton. The union dispute was led by John Macreadie, a known Trotskyist. The ten-week dispute ended in early November 1977. At the time, civil controllers received around £8,000, and ATC assistants around £7,000. RAF (Flt Lt) controllers received around £5,000. ATC staff had a mandatory annual medical examination, and their licence could be removed if not in good health.

On Monday 9 March 1981 there was a one-day strike by 1,500 controllers from IPCS. Regional airport controllers were part of NALGO, so did not go in strike. There were no international commercial flights, for the first time since the 1940s. More strikes occurred from late April 1981. Possibly due to the strike, a BA 727 and a BA Trident narrowly missed each other at 19,000 ft, over Southampton, on Monday 27 April 1981. The strike finished around early August 1981.

In 1987 the CAA had 1400 civil controllers, who earned £22,000; the RAF had 950.

In 1990 the CAA was so short of ATC staff, it travelled to the US, to acquire ex-military controllers.

== Training ==
International Aeradio opened a controller school in West London in 1958, the largest of its kind, in the world. From 1966 this trained all Swiss controllers, for Radio Suisse.

In the early 1960s, both military and civil radar operators were trained at a joint school at RAF Sopley. Sopley had the joint radar school from October 1960. Sopley remained jointly-run until December 1970, when only military personnel were trained. Sopley closed as radar school around August 1972.

Around sixty countries would send ATC trainees to the College of Air Traffic Control (CATC) in Dorset, including Eastern Europe. Training was for three years, requiring 5 O-levels and 2 A-levels. Around 15% were female.

=== Military ===
The Central Air Traffic Control School RAF trained military ATC personnel from 1963; the first women ATC trainees began later in 1963. In 1984 Shawbury had 250 trainees a year, on a 17-week course.

The RAF had radar and avionics training at RAF Locking, which moved to Shropshire around 1999 to be part of what is now the Defence School of Communications and Information Systems.

== Aircraft movements ==
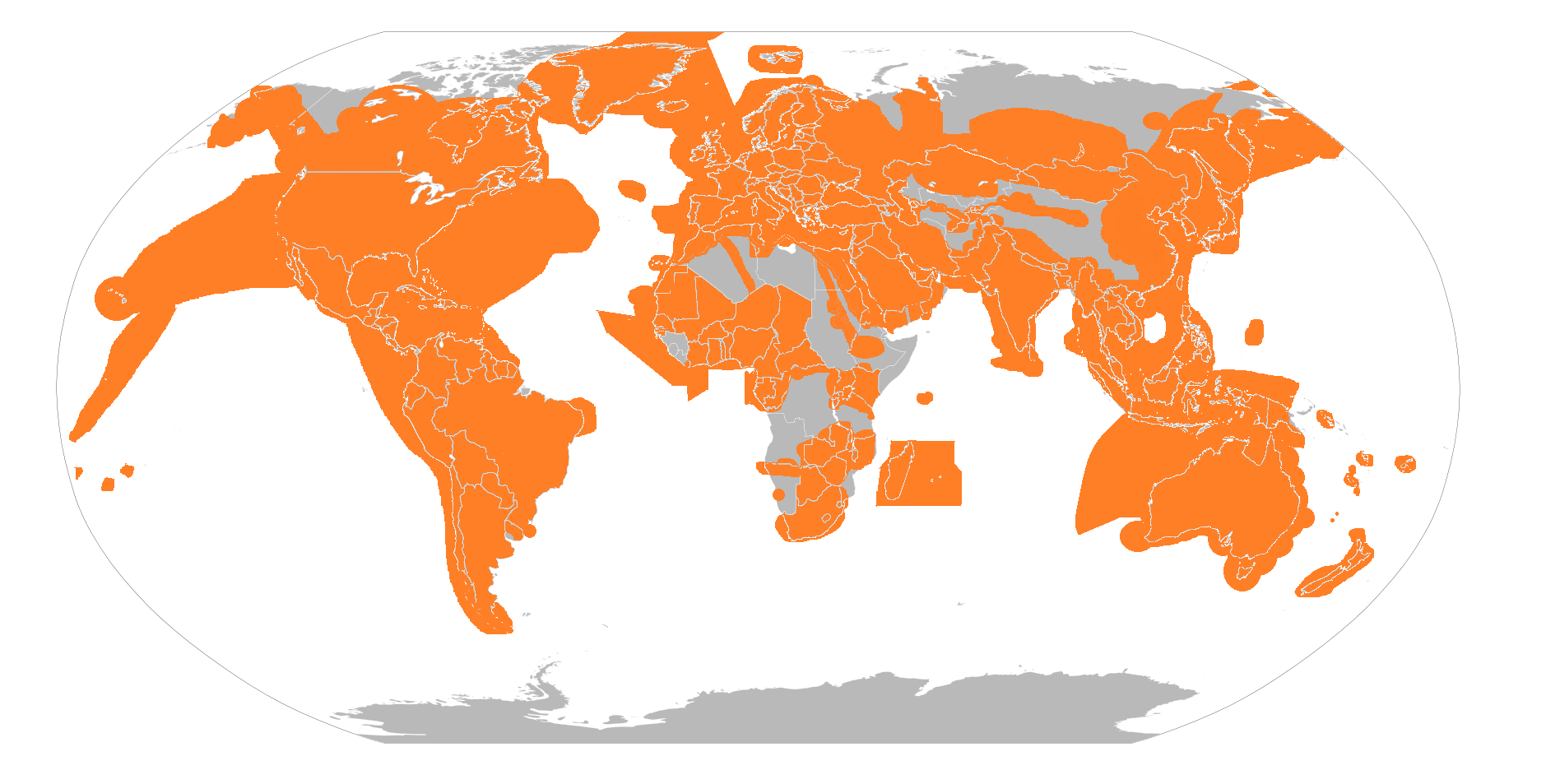
Worldwide radar coverage

There were 372,000 aircraft movements in the UK in 1960, 480,000 in 1962, and 610,000 by 1969.

The Concorde route from Heathrow Airport to Bahrain was the world's first supersonic air transport route.

In the 1980s, south-east England had the busiest airspace in the world, with up to 3,500 aircraft movements per day.

In 2017, NATS handled around 2.5 million flights.

=== Transatlantic route ===
Although the first Atlantic crossing by an aircraft was in June 1919, the next crossing was eight years later.

The first east-west crossing was by Major George Herbert Scott, from RAF East Fortune in Scotland taking 108 hours, on 2 July 1919 in a R.34 airship, constructed in south Norfolk. The first east-west crossing, in an aircraft, was on 12 April 1928 by Hermann Köhl and James Fitzmaurice, in a Junkers W 33, landing in Greenly Island, Canada.

The first experimental flight west-east was on Monday 5 July 1937 from Botwood in Canada, to Foynes in County Limerick, in the Sikorsky S-42, known as 'Clipper'.

An Imperial Airways Short Empire Caledonia made the east-west route, in 15 hours. Technically, the first commercial flight across the Atlantic was carried out by a Short Mayo Composite on July 21 1938, of Imperial Airways. The Boeing 314 Clipper made the first scheduled service from Botwood on June 27 1939.

Only by 1939 were regular transatlantic flights made, only for air mail. RAF Ferry Command brought aircraft across the Atlantic, during the War, with around 25,000 pilots being returned by BOAC's North Atlantic Return Ferry Service from September 1941. One year after the war, commercial Atlantic flights began.

In February 1959 the ICAO decided to build a communications cable from Gander to Prestwick in 1960. Radio communication was often disrupted by the auroras. The transatlantic cable would travel from Corner Brook, in Canada, to Narsarmijit, Greenland to Vestmannaeyjar in Iceland. The cable came into operation in November 1963, being designed by the GPO, Canadian Overseas Telecommunications Corporation, and the Great Northern Telegraph Company of Denmark (now GN Store Nord).

There were around two hundred transatlantic aircraft crossings per day in 1961; this was expected to rise to three hundred crossings by 1965.

From the summer of 1961, Atlantic routes were calculated by a Ferranti Apollo computer, at Prestwick.

From 1975 this Prestwick computer connected with the Gander Automated Air Traffic System in Canada. The Ferranti Apollo was replaced in 1987. Thus 1987 computer was quite unreliable and frequently crashed, 25 times in the first year. The 1987 computer at Prestwick was replaced in 2006 by the Shanwick Automated Air Traffic System.

The Shanwick radar is at Ballygirreen in County Clare.

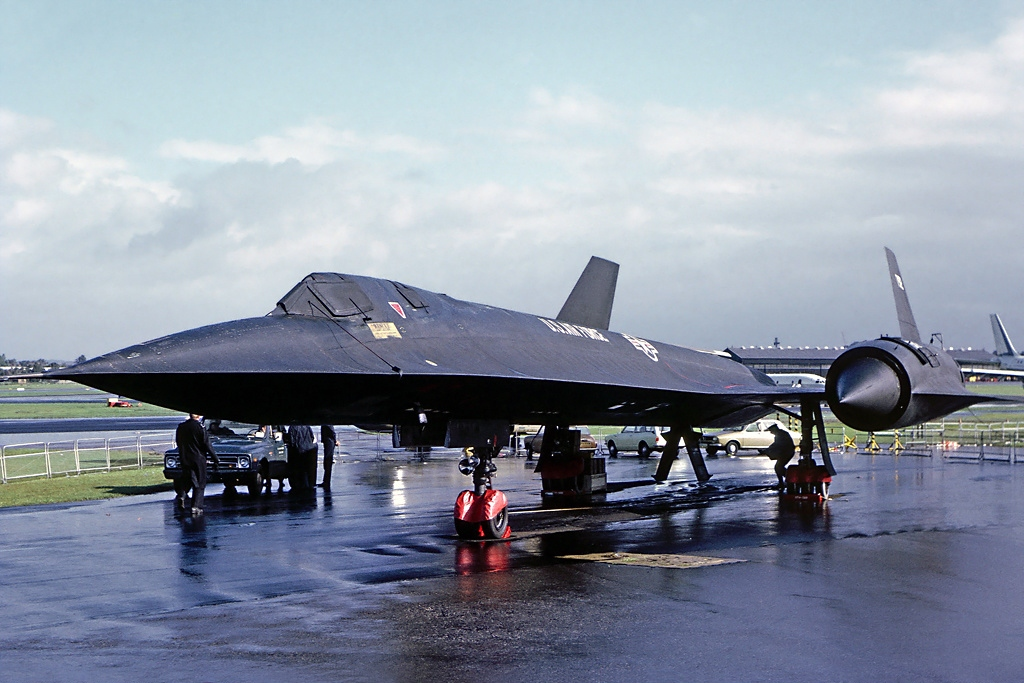
The SR-71 61-7972, that set the fastest Atlantic crossing, seen in September 1974, now housed at the Steven F. Udvar-Hazy Center in Virginia

On Sunday 1 September 1974 Burrington tracked a Lockheed SR-71 Blackbird crossing the Atlantic in under two hours, from the 9th Reconnaissance Wing at Beale Air Force Base. This is the fastest transatlantic flight recorded, at an average speed of 1,817 mph (2,924 km/h), at 80,000 ft (15 miles). The pilot was Major James Sullivan, with Reconnaissance Systems Officer Major Noel Widdifield, of the 1st Reconnaissance Squadron Lockheed put a full page advert on page 5 of The Times, later that week, in the style of British Airways.

In January 1979, Software Sciences Ltd, of Hampshire founded by Colin Southgate, was given the £3m contract for the flight data processing system for the Oceanic FIR centre at Prestwick, and to calculate the North Atlantic Tracks. It was to be run on a DEC PDP-11/70 computer. It was written in CORAL, and developed at the RRE in Malvern, where much of Britain's important radar technology was largely developed in the 1950s and 1960s. The Central Research Laboratories in west London, of EMI, also conducted important radar research.

In December 1992, 700 aircraft crossed the Atlantic each day, separated vertically by 2,000 ft, and horizontally by 10 minutes, or 60 miles (97 km).

The new £120 million Prestwick centre was approved in October 2003. Construction would start in 2004, to open in 2009.

The UK has the third-largest aviation network after the US and China. Up to 80% of North Atlantic air traffic passes through UK airspace. The Shanwick OCA (Shanwick Oceanic Control) was formed in 1966, and controlled from Prestwick, with two communication towers in southern Ireland and Gloucestershire.

== Radar manufacturers ==
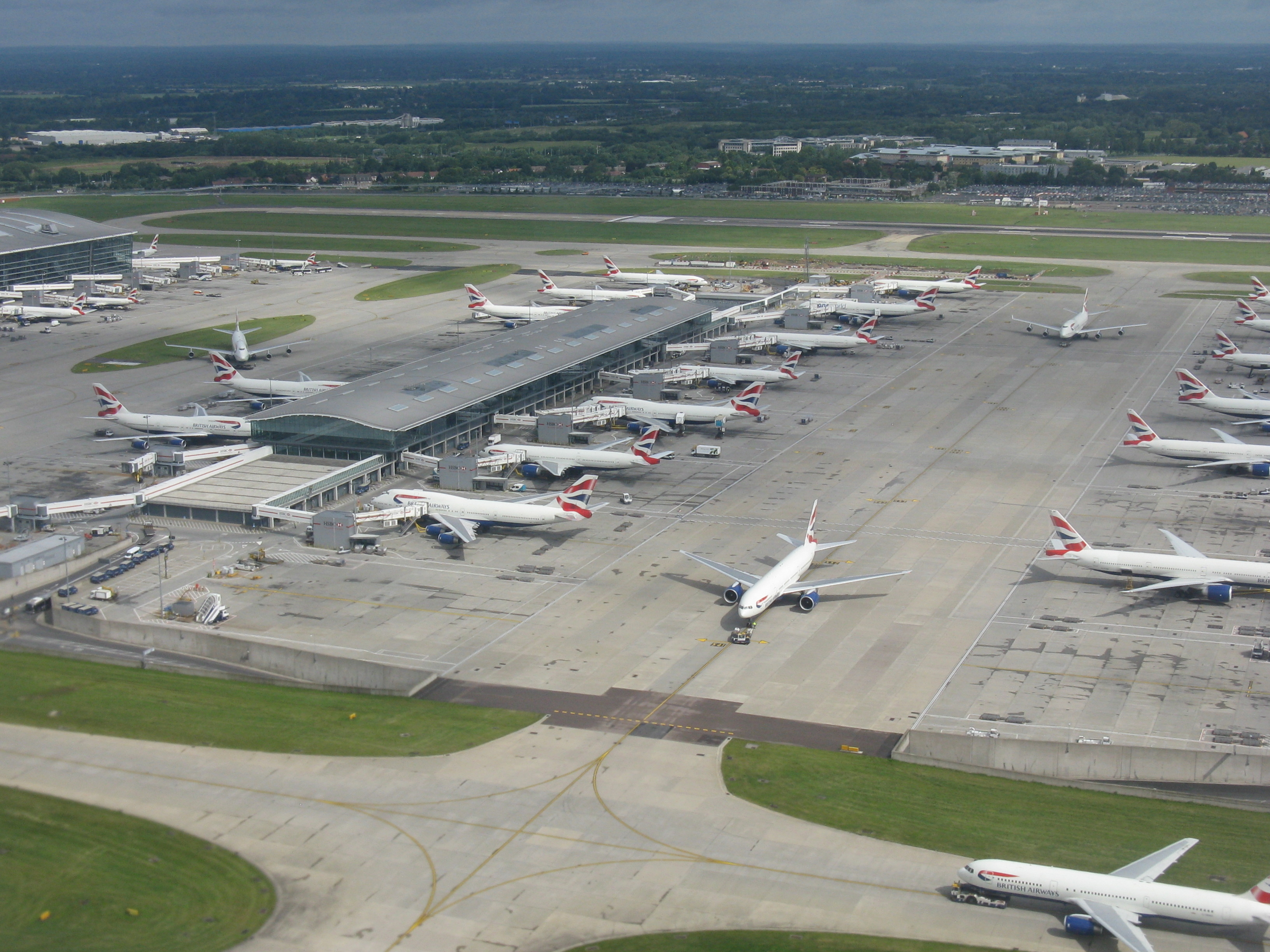
Heathrow in June 2012

The RAAF signed a contract with Plessey for their air defence system, to be delivered by late 1967, known as the Hubcap Project.

In July 1965 Plessey had a £400,000 order for three AR-1 radars at Sofia, Varna and Burgas in Bulgaria, the country's first system

STC won the £875,000 contract for radar systems at Baghdad Airport in August 1966.

In 1970 Plessey Radar were given a £1 million contract by the East African Community, to supply radar for most of East Africa.

By July 1972, Software Sciences of Hampshire had built the ATC system for the Royal Netherlands Air Force, known as PHAROS - Plan Handling and Radar Operating System. it was built with Nederlandsche Standard Electric and Stansaab Elektronik of Sweden; it worked on two Stansaab Censor 932 computers.

In October 1978, Plessey received a £9 million contract to build the radar and flight data processing system for the Austrian FIR.

In 1981 Software Sciences Ltd, part of Thorn-EMI, was given a £235,000 contract by Hollandse Signaalapparaten, of Hengelo in the Netherlands, for the radar processing system for five radar sites covering the North Sea, including Heathrow and Gatwick, to be installed from 1982. In July 1985 the company gained a £250,000 contract to supply the computers to process radar from Clee Hill and Burrington.

The Portuguese Air Force bought the Watchman. In November 1988 the US Tactical Air Command bought the military version of the Watchman radar, for battlefield radar.

STC installed ILS at Sheremetyevo International Airport, the busiest airport in Russia, and at Bucharest Henri Coandă International Airport and at Maastricht Airport in 1968.

Plessey Navaids, of Addlestone in north Surrey, bought the ILS system of STC in 1971. Plessey Navaids won a £100,000 contract in 1977 for a PLAN 50 DVOR system at Drammen in Norway, to serve Oslo Airport, and for £133,000 for its PLAN 17/18 ILS system at Kota Kinabalu International Airport, the second-largest in Malaysia.

== Airfield approach technology ==
=== Calvert lighting ===
The Calvert crossbar approach lighting was developed with John Sparke. The lighting system was tested and developed at RAF Hullavington, in Wiltshire, in 1948, by the All Weather Research Squadron, with Avro Lancastrian aircraft of the Empire Flying School, being first installed at Heathrow in 1948.

=== DME and TACAN ===
Sven Henry Marriott Dodington (20 May 1912 - January 1992), with a British father from Herefordshire who was educated at Cheltenham College, and a Danish mother; he partly attended Sidcot School in Somerset between 1924-27, and invented the TACAN and DME systems, in the US. Dodington is buried in north Dorset. His family was descended from Horsington House near Templecombe in Somerset. Dodington developed TACAN with ITT at Nutley, New Jersey in the 1950s. His father died near Hereford in 1919.

=== VASI ===
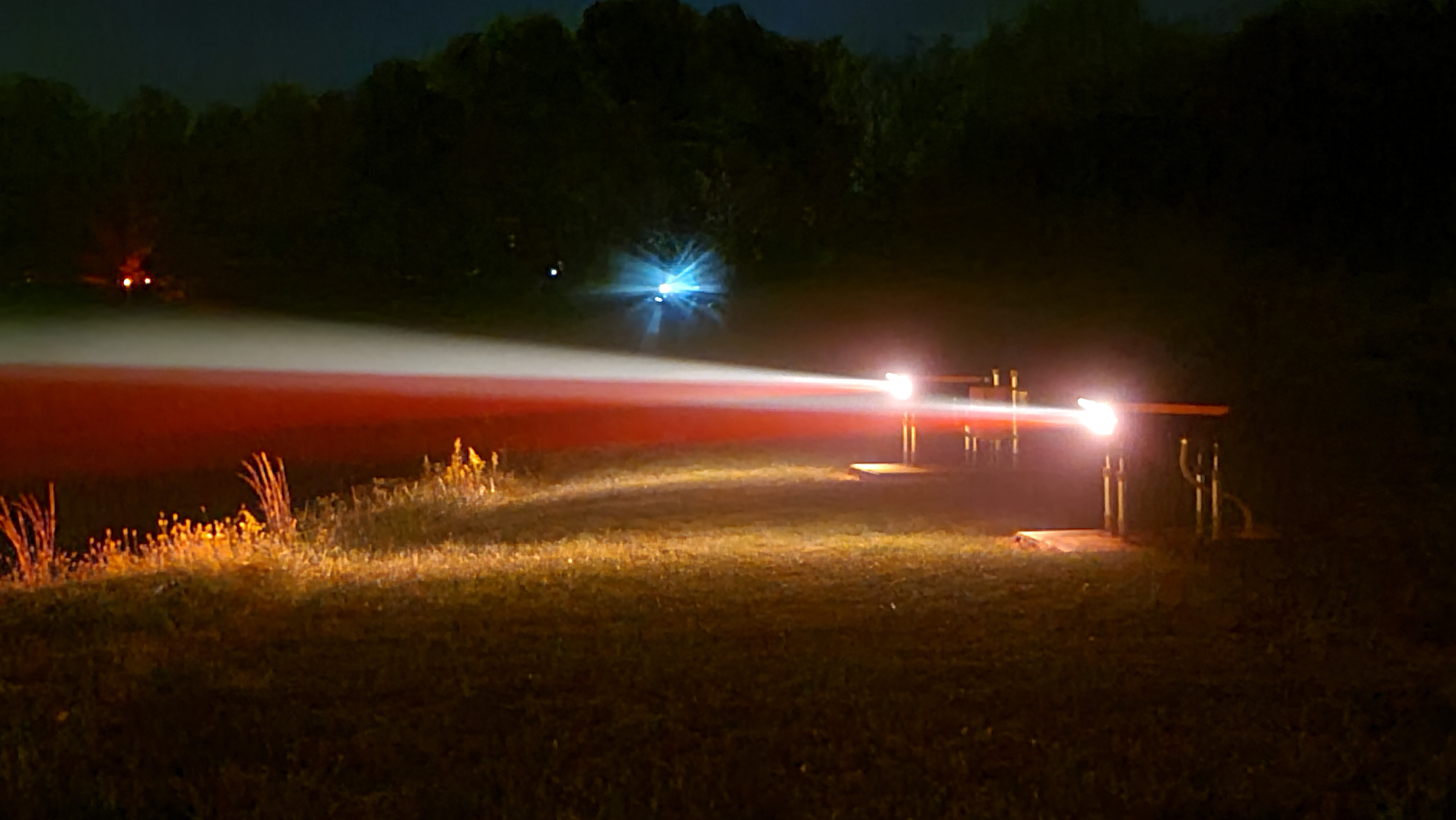
VASI approach system

The visual approach slope indicator (VASI) system was originally developed at the RAE. It was developed by RAE and GEC, by Jack Sparke and Edward Spence Calvert, being developed in the late 1950s. Edward Calvert developed the underside lights for Operation Chastise. It was tested at five airports, including Prestwick and Dyce, in mid-1958. VSAI entered service from 1960. Atlas Lighting, of London, made the system in early 1960s, part of British Lighting Industries. VASI was adopted by ICAO, as a standard system on 1 October 1961.

=== PAPI ===
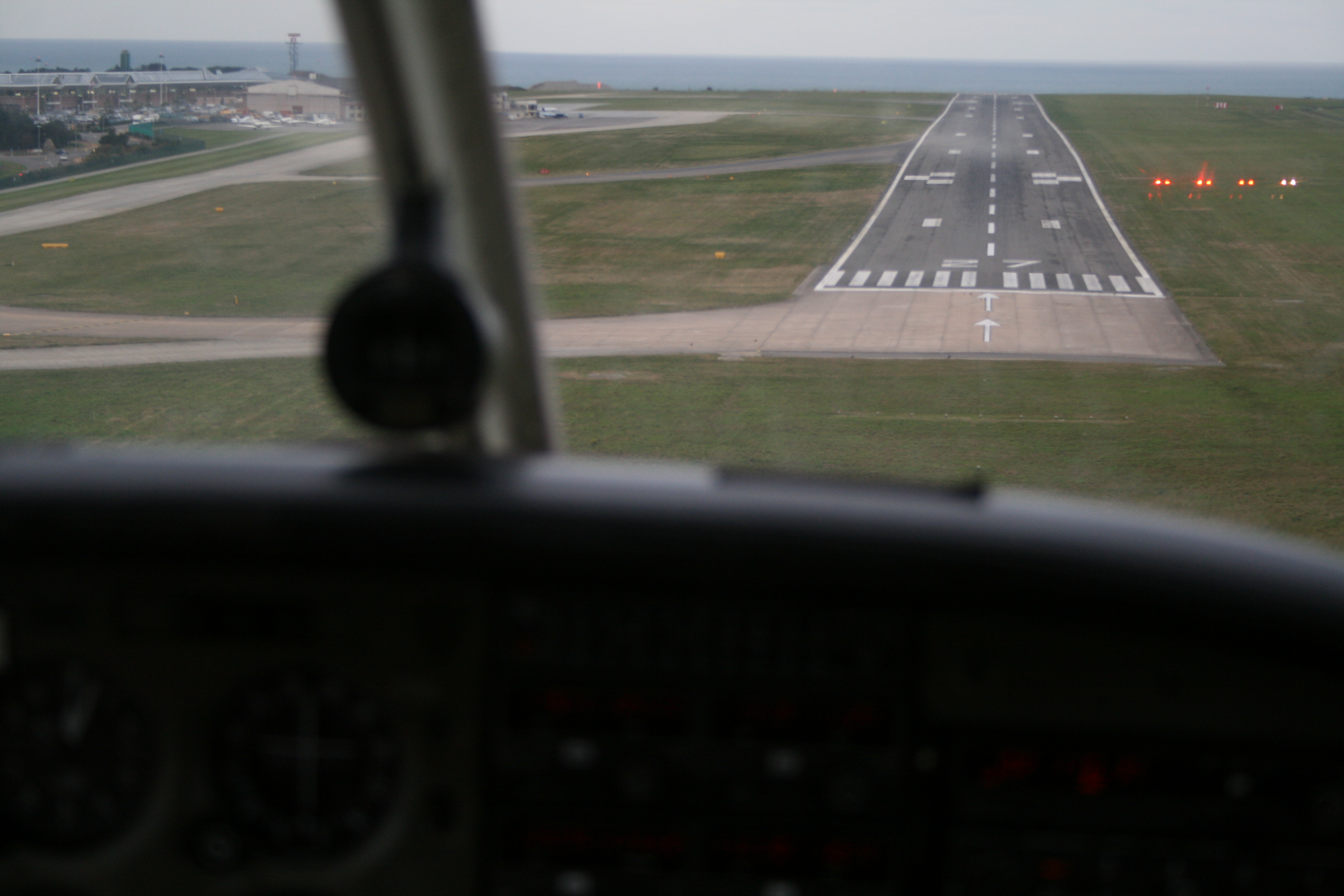
Precision approach path indicator in November 2007; one red is too high a glide slope, and three reds is too low

The later precision approach path indicator (PAPI) system was developed by Tony Smith and David Johnson in the mid-1970s at RAE Bedford. PAPI was trialled at Gatwick in 1977. Gatwick was the first main airport with PAPI installed. PAPI entered service around May 1979. Tony Smith lived on Barnwell Drive in Rushden in Northamptonshire. PAPI became standard in 1983 with ICAO and NATO. The Space Shuttle was guided to the runway, with the PAPI system.

VASI and PAPI

== En-route communications ==
Early VHF communications with aircraft began around 1950. From Monday 8 May 1950 ATC staff at RAF Prestwick could speak to pilots on 122.1 MHz.

=== Secondary radar and transponders ===
Secondary radar is a direct descendant of the British IFF system, after Welsh engineer Richard Davies (courtier) persuaded the Americans to adopt the technology in 1942.

Pip-squeak was invented by Eric Charles Williams CB (May 15 1915 - January 8 1980) in March 1939, working with Canadian Harold Larnder (1902-81), fitted from early 1940, who had studied Physics at the University of Birmingham.

In the 1950s government physicist Ronald Lionel Gillham developed the Gillham code for transponder altitude data.

From the early 1960s, A.C. Cossor at Harlow claimed to be the only company in Europe making secondary radar.

A meeting in December 1960 between the UK and the US determined how secondary radar would broadly work. By the early 1960s, the USA required US-registered aircraft, flying above 25,000 ft, to have a transponder for secondary surveillance radar. The transponder equipment would cost about £2,000. Without this radar, there was a 1,500-mile (2,400 km) radar gap in the North Atlantic. Secondary radar would close this gap. It was hoped to have around eight secondary radar units to cover the UK, with 180 miles (290 km) range, from around 1963. There would be a maximum of 64 transponder codes available.

Air France and BOAC ordered the Cossor SSR.1251 transponder system for their Boeing 707 aircraft.

By 1 July 1962 all aircraft flying over 25,000 ft in the UK were to have had a transponder fitted. This date was moved to 1 July 1965, then to 1 July 1966, and also applied to Eurocontrol countries. Not enough aircraft had had transponders fitted, and not enough ground radar units had had enough secondary radar added.

A three-day international symposium was held from Monday 23 September 1963 at the Royal Radar Establishment in Worcestershire, with around 250 delegates, to discuss advances in radar such as transponders. It was organised by the Ministry of Aviation and the Electronic Engineering Association.

In April 1965 Russia (through Aviaexport) bought fifty SSR.1600 ATC Airborne Transponders for its Aeroflot fleet, and for manufacturers such as Tupolev, for £80,000. The Concorde team turned down this transponder.

The SSR.2100 transponder was fitted to aircraft such as Concorde, the BAC 1-11, Trident, and the Viscount.

In a £2.75 million contract, Plessey supplied the secondary radar system for the new West Drayton site, to operate from mid-1969, on Plessey Digitrace screens.

The British-French Marconi SECAR secondary radar was chosen for Eurocontrol and Brussels Airport.

In 1979 Cossor developed its Adsel transponder system. From 1983, this system was internationally called Mode S (S=selective) to avoid FRUIT (False Returns Unsynchronised with Interrogator Transmissions). It was being trialled in British Midland aircraft.

Cossor largely developed the monopulse system, entering service from the early 1980s. Cossor was the leading company for transponders, right into the 1990s.

The selective Mode S system had been also developed in Worcestershire since the late 1960s. The S band works with 10-cm radar.

== Radar stations ==
Marconi Radar Systems, who built much of the radar, had sites at Bill Quay in Gateshead (mechanical infrastructure), in the north of Leicester (at the junction of Blackbird Road and Anstey Lane), and two large sites in Chelmsford, although much of these radars were for air defence.

The radome canopies were made by English Electric Reinforced Plastic Division at Warton, which became GEC Reinforced Plastics, moving to GEC Engineering at Clayton-le-Moors, north of Accrington, in 1992, later becoming Techbuild Composites in 1994; off the A6185 at junction 7 of the M65.

27 Doppler VOR (VHF omnidirectional range) beacons, costing £3.5 million, were built in 1982 by Racal Avionics (former Decca Radar) of New Malden. The first Cossor 20 monopulse SSR 950 were installed in June 1983, replacing Cossor 5G, which were installed in mid 1960s. The first RAF monopulse system was at Scampton in January 1987. A contract for 17 secondary radar sets was given to Marconi Radar Systems in 1985.

In the early 1990s most low-level (up to 100 feet) primary radars for airports and RAF airfields were updated to be the Plessey Watchman, which had around a 50-mile (80 km) range. Heathrow, Gatwick, Stansted, Manchester and Gatwick were updated in 1988, or early 1989, costing around £2 million each. The system had been trialled at Exeter Airport (owned by Devon County Council); Watchman was a much more advanced radar system. East Midlands and Newcastle had the Marconi S511.

The RAF had chosen the Watchman radar system for its airfields in the UK, and overseas, in June 1983. The first to receive the system was RAF Waddington in 1986. Other countries bought the Plessey Watchman as well, including Finland and Spain, for the Palma de Mallorca Airport, which in the month of August, in the 1980s, became the world's busiest airport.

Selex ATCR-33S radars replaced some Plessey Watchman radars across airfields in the early 2010s.

In June 2016 Raytheon received a contract to supply the Mode S monopulse secondary radar to all of NATS 23 radar sites. A Radar Reference Facility was built by Raytheon in Hampshire, to train staff.

The sites are technically referred to as radar heads.

=== Civilian ===
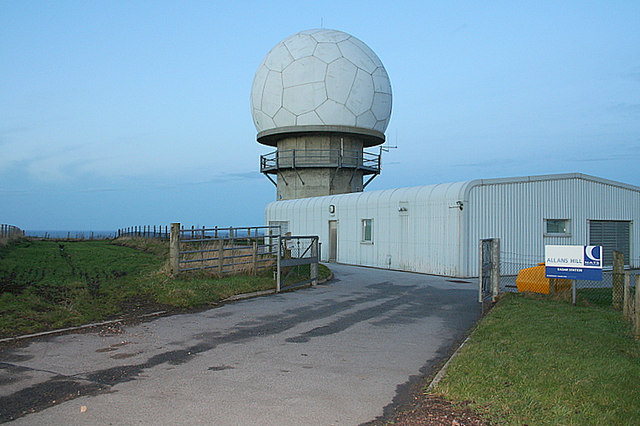
Allans Hill in Aberdeenshire in January 2007

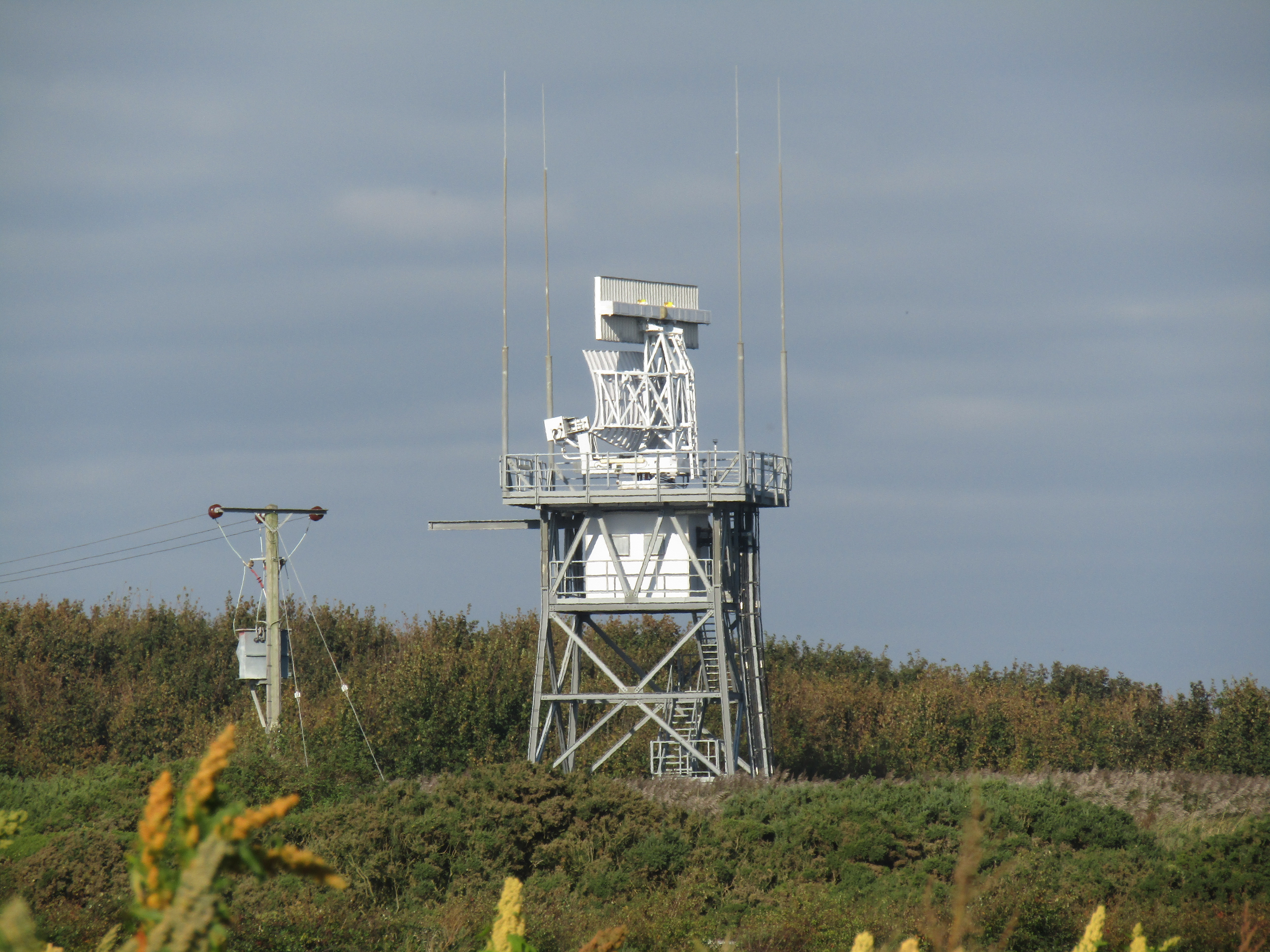
Cromer radar station in October 2018; it has a Raytheon ASR 10SS

Pease Pottage Air Traffic Radar, March 2023

- Allans Hill, Aberdeenshire; situated between New Aberdour and Strichen, with a 9.5 m (31 ft) tower, had a Plessey Watchman, mainly for helicopters, with a range of 90 miles (140 km); planning permission was granted in April 1991, to be built by 1994; 9.5 m (31 ft) high, built by Kier Construction, radar by Siemens Plessey Systems, opened February 1994
- Blackpool, has a Raytheon ASR 10SS; it was fitted with 500 kW 50 cm Marconi Type 264A, when operating the Mediator system, from 1963
- Burrington, Devon, opened in June 1973; the £360,000 processing system was built by Plessey Radar, with three Modular One computers built by Computer Technology in Hemel Hempstead
- Claxby, also known as Lincoln, in north-east Lincolnshire, has a 250-mile (400 km) range, on land owned by BT; it replaced the 35 m (115 ft) steel lattice Claxby Radio Station, run by the Post Office (later BT); would be 42 m (138 ft) high, to open by 1984; was built directly next to the former GPO lattice tower in late 1983; Claxby, Clee Hill and St Annes radar were sent to the regional ATC centre at Manchester Airport; Claxby was built largely for Lincolnshire's RAF stations
- In August 1970, a new £150,000 Plessey AR-5 23 cm radar for Titterstone Clee Hill, in Shropshire, was to be built by 1971; Clee Hill had RAF radar during World War II, but this site had closed in 1956; the radome was fitted in September 1968, the first radome in the UK; radar information was sent back to London from microwave links at Romsley, Worcestershire, Whichford Hill in the south of Warwickshire, and Christmas Common in the Chilterns, south of the M40; the Plessey DASR-1 en-route system had been there since 1964; the secondary radar had direct connections to Heathrow and Manchester airports, and later to Birmingham in 1979, and East Midlands in 1980
- Cromer Radar was set up in the late 1980s, with a link to a new air traffic control centre at Stansted; it had Plessey Watchman as its primary radar for the North Sea, often for helicopters travelling to North Sea oil platforms. The RAF and RN also had Cromer as their primary radar; it worked via a travelling-wave tube.
- Debden, Uttlesford, in Essex, the 23 cm (9.1-inch) radar has a 160-mile (260 km) range; planning permission was given in June 1980, being built around 1981; it provided secondary radar for Stansted until 1991; designed by Clifford Tee + Gale, and structural engineering by the Alan Marshall Partnership
- Great Dun Fell, opened on Friday 7 October 1988, built by Mowlem Regional Construction; primary radar by Hollandse Signaalapparaten B.V. (now called Thales Nederland), it cost £10.5 million, it is next to the Pennine Way, east of Milburn, Cumbria
- Heathrow, the 23 cm radar opened in November 1985 with a 250-mile (400 km) range, and a 37-metre-high (121 ft) concrete tower, that was built by Fairclough Civil Engineering of Adlington in Lancashire; this has been replaced by a site at Bovingdon, of Dacorum in Hertfordshire around 2012
- Lowther Hill, at 2,377 ft high near Wanlockhead, on the boundary of Lanarkshire and Dumfriesshire, it was the centre of the Scottish GEE network, which began on 19 August 1948, with slave stations at Craigowl Hill, 1493 feet high, at Tealing, north of Dundee, and Ru Stafnish on Kintyre, 709 feet high, in Argyll and Bute, on the west coast of Scotland; from May 1950 it had a radio en-route transmitter for contact with pilots in Scotland, in the VHF range from 110 to 130 MHz; chosen in December 1964 totally rebuilt, with Perwinnes Hill, commissioned in 1996, with a 23 cm SPR51 Routeman fitted; built by Kier Construction, radar by Siemens Plessey Systems
- Mount Gabriel, southern Ireland, feeds into LACC
- Pease Pottage, in the north-east of West Sussex, a 23 cm radar opened in December 1986, on land owned by the Met Office, with a 160-mile (260 km) range; 37 m (121 ft) high, with a 15 m (49 ft) wide dish, it was the Crawley meteorological station, which opened in April 1953; in full operation by 1954; launched four radiosonde weather balloons per day; readings were set to the Met Office in Dunstable
- Perwinnes Hill, near Aberdeen, for Aberdeen Airport at Dyce, and the helicopters for the North Sea; it had a £325,000 Marconi 264 radar installed on 7 October 1976, which had been obtained from RAF Sopley; it was improved in the mid-1980s to take radar coverage to 150 miles (240 km), with secondary radar, and totally rebuilt in the mid-1990s, with a 19 m (62 ft) tower, and improved in February 1994, to stop reliance on RRH Buchan for coverage of the North Sea, built by Kier Construction, with radar by Siemens Plessey Systems; the previous 264 radar had been maintained from parts taken from the former Ash and Ventnor radar stations; in the 1980s Aberdeen was the world's biggest heliport
- Tiree, at Ben Hynish on the Inner Hebrides, it has a 201-nanometre (1.25×10^{−10} mi; 2.01×10^{−10} km); the £8 million radar replaced a military radar in 3 cm radar Northern Ireland, and opened in July 1986; a new television transmitter was required to be built as well; the structural engineer was Sir Frederick Snow; 30 m (98 ft) high, built by Mowlem, of Kilsyth, in a £2.47 million contract, completed in March 1985

=== Military ===
By 1964, the RAF had four main military radar units.

- Hack Green, near Baddington in south Cheshire
- RAF Boulmer, on the Northumberland coast
- RAF Sopley in south-west Hampshire
- RAF Bishops Court, near Killard Point, near Downpatrick, County Down, in Northern Ireland; this opened in July 1959.

=== Former ===
- Ash in Kent, the former RAF Ash with Marconi S264A
- Ventnor, the former RAF Ventnor with Marconi S264A

== European central air traffic control ==
A central European agency was first discussed in early 1958 at a regional ICAO meeting. There was a further meeting in Brussels in late October 1959, chaired by Pierre Nottet, of Belgium, the first head of the European Civil Aviation Conference (ECAC) from 1955-57. Eurocontrol was formed at a conference in France in November 1959.

On Thursday 9 June 1960, Britain, France, Belgium, Italy, Luxembourg, West Germany and Holland decided to coordinate air traffic control as jet aircraft were much quicker, to prevent collisions.

Eurocontrol was planned to have jurisdiction over 25,000 ft in the UK, from around 1965.

In 1965, France and UK did not support a single agency for all ATC, due to military considerations. Eurocontrol ATC centres at Shannon and Karlsruhe went under national operation.

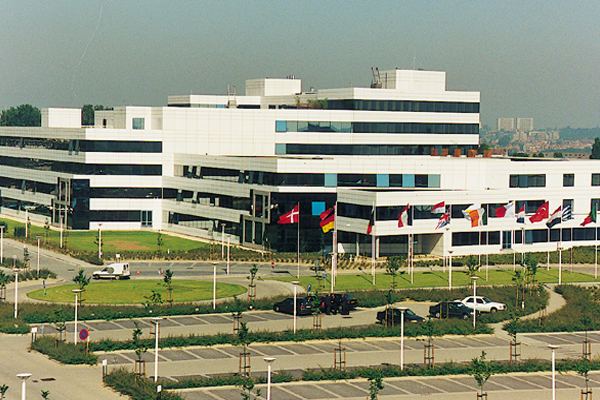
Eurocontrol in Haren, Belgium in November 2005

On Friday 20 December 1968, an agreement was signed to build Europe's first international control centre at Maastricht, to open in 1972, called the Maastricht Automatic Data Processing system or MADAP, which is now called the Maastricht Upper Area Control Centre; for the site, Plessey would build two computers, the controllers' consoles and a radar distribution unit. In 1981, the first computer data link between LATCC at West Drayton and Eurocontrol was established, followed by Brest Airport and Reims in 1986 and Paris in 1987; advanced boundary information (ABI) began in late 1990.

Eurocontrol, established on 1 March 1964, had been initially set up for eventually becoming a Europe-wide full air traffic control system, but individual countries could not together form agreements for this to fully happen; this meant that by the late 1980s Eurocontrol oversaw only flights above 25,000 feet over the Netherlands, Belgium and part of West Germany.

In 1988, countries paid £85 million for Eurocontrol, and Britain funded a 27.2% share.

British and German airlines flying to Spain were often held up by French ATC industrial action in the late 1980s, orchestrated by the SNCTA trade union. Mrs Thatcher wanted no-strike agreements, for controllers, across Europe. Thousands of passengers at Gatwick and Manchester were having to sleep overnight in terminal buildings in the summer of 1988, due to flight backlogs across Europe.

Keith Mack, controller of NATS from 1985 to 1988, was director of Eurocontrol from 1989 to 1993. In 1988, Europe had 18 civilian, and 20 military ATC networks

In the late 1980s the 46 regional ATC centres across Europe communicated with each other by telephone, to request landing slots.

In July 1989, 23 countries agreed to build a £40 million central ATC building in Belgium, to open by 1993. BT Global Network Services were given a five-year contract in April 1993, for a pan-European digital data network. Previous to this, individual countries contacted each other via telephone. In May 1995 a new £70 million computer system was switched on in Brussels.

On 24 January 2001 Europe implemented the reduced vertical separation minimum (RVSM) at 29,000 ft to 41,000 ft from 2,000 to 1,000 ft.

Much of European air traffic control is run on the CIMACT software package. The Single European Sky was agreed on 5 December 2002, and passed by the European Parliament on 29 January 2004.

== See also ==
- Aerospace industry in the United Kingdom § History
- Aviation in the United Kingdom § History
  - Air transport in the United Kingdom § History
  - General aviation in the United Kingdom § History
- History of British Airways
- List of aviation, avionics, aerospace and aeronautical abbreviations
- Timeline of British military aviation
