= Air transport in the United Kingdom =

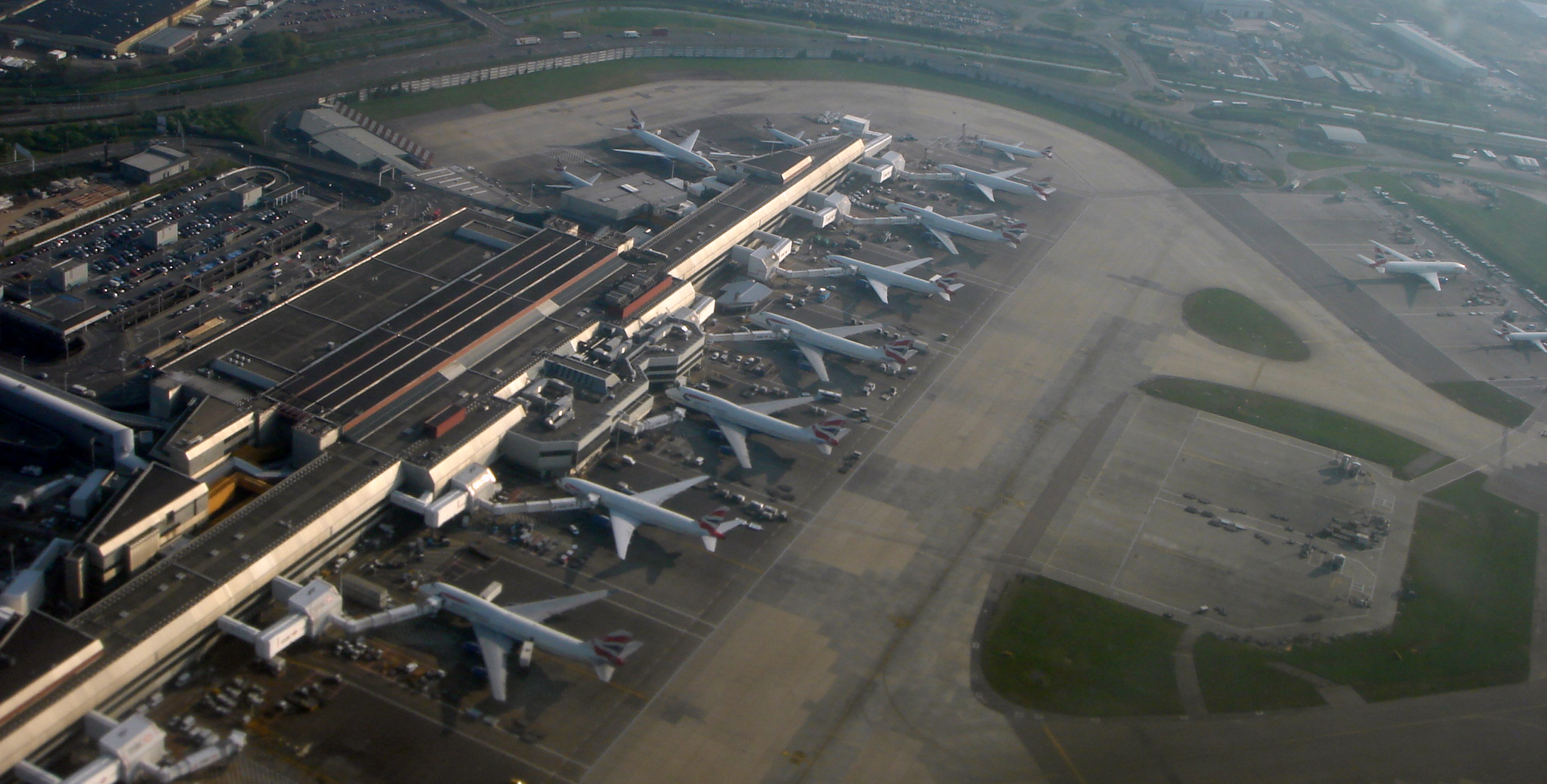
Terminal 4 at Heathrow Airport

Air transport in the United Kingdom covers the commercial carriage of passengers, freight, and mail by aircraft, both within the United Kingdom (UK) and between the UK and the rest of the world. In 2024 the UK had the third highest number of passengers carried, behind only the United States (US) and China.

More than half of all passengers travelling by air in the UK currently travel via one of the six London area airports. Among these, Heathrow Airport is one of the ten busiest airports in the world. Manchester Airport is the largest and busiest UK airport outside of London, acting as a hub for the roughly 20 million people living in the vicinity. Regional airports have achieved the most growth in recent years due to the success of low-cost carrier airlines.

After a plunge in traffic in 2020 and 2021, UK air travel increased significantly in 2022 with over 224 million passengers travelling to and from UK airports, thereby reaching 75 per cent of 2019 levels. The demand for passenger air travel is forecast to increase from the 2024 level of 295 million passengers to 425 million in 2050, raising questions regarding its environmental impact.

== History ==
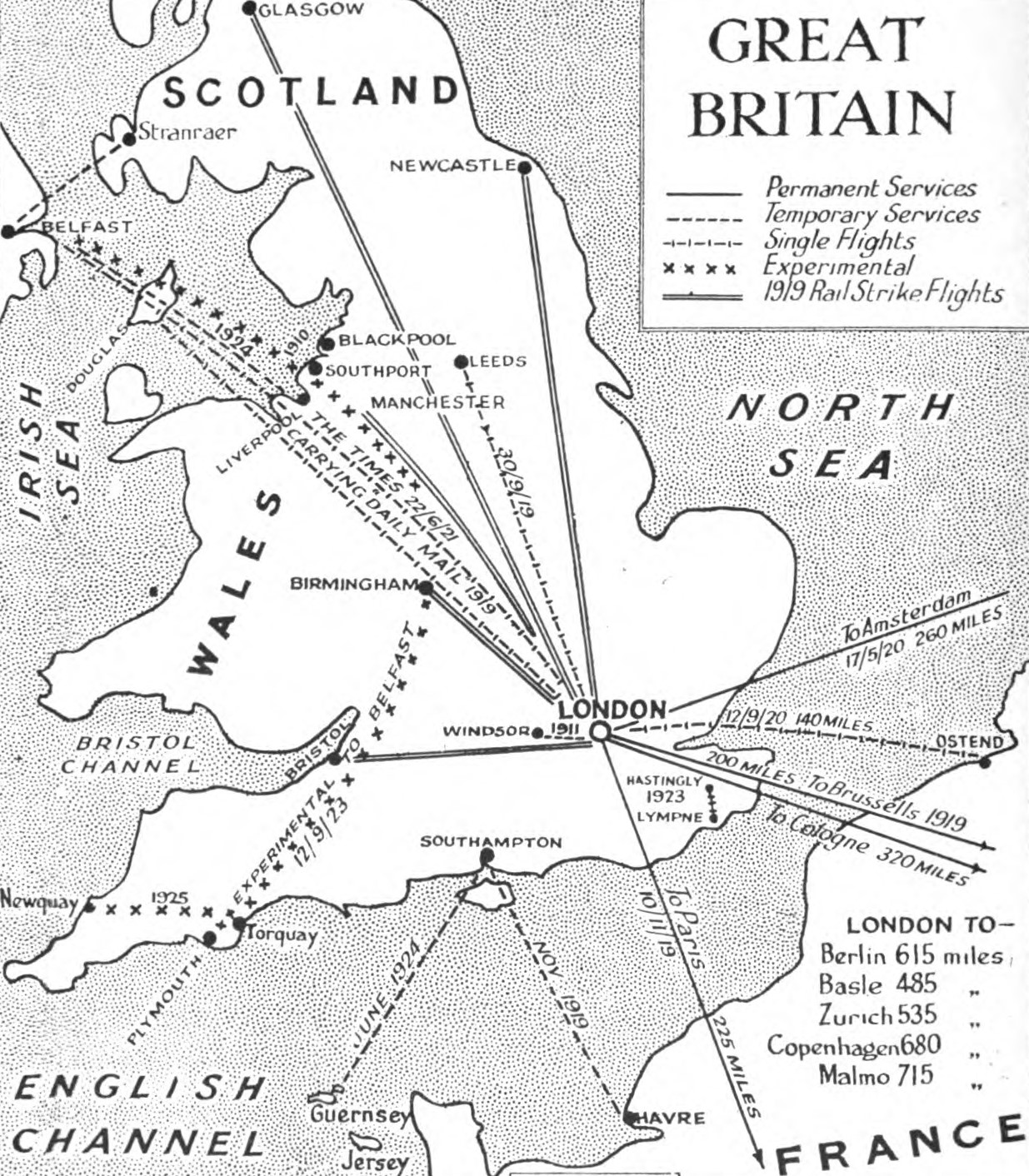
Air routes of the United Kingdom in 1925

Imperial Airways and British Airways Limited were merged and nationalised as British Overseas Airways Corporation (BOAC) in 1939. BOAC in turn merged with British European Airways (BEA) in 1974 to form British Airways (BA). In the 1970s, the aircraft manufacturers British Aircraft Corporation (BAC), Hawker Siddeley Aviation, Hawker Siddeley Dynamics, and Scottish Aviation were merged and nationalised as British Aerospace (BAe). In the 1980s, both BA and BAe were privatised by the Thatcher government.

The advent in the mid-1990s of "no-frills" carriers such as easyJet and BA's Go had a significant impact on air travel in the UK. In 2005 these airlines carried 77.5 million passengers, up from just 4.3 million in 1996. They were also responsible for the growth of regional airports, numbering 35 in 2006 compared to 10 in 1996, and increasing the choice of international destinations to 150 in 2006 compared with 12 a decade earlier.

The annual rate of growth in the overall demand for air travel has remained stable since 1975, with current growth being served by the no-frills airlines at the expense of traditional carriers, which have experienced flat or declining traffic levels since 2000. In response, these traditional carriers have lowered costs to compete more effectively on price, leading to lower prices on their short haul routes, especially business fares. They have also limited or reduced capacity, and in some cases launched no-frills subsidiaries of their own.

== Airports ==
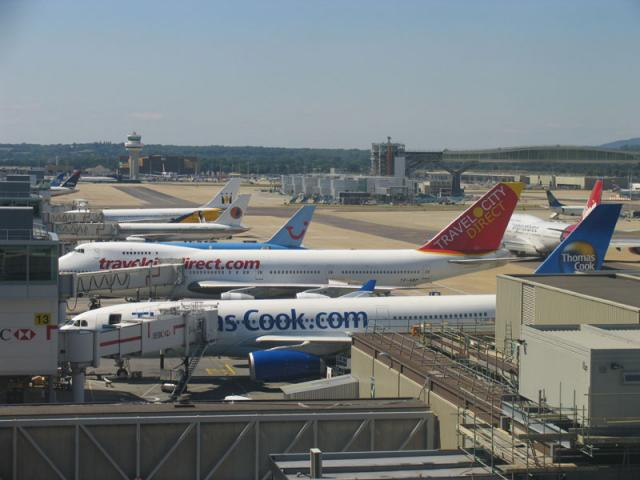
South Terminal at Gatwick Airport

The number of airports in the UK runs into the hundreds, although many are smaller aerodromes dealing with general aviation rather than air transport. In terms of the latter, statistics are collected from 59 main airports, with the largest concentration of services located in the London and South East England areas.

Heathrow Airport is the largest airport in the country, handling over 84 million terminal passengers in 2025. This made it the seventh busiest airport in the world as of that date, and the second busiest by number of international passengers. Nearly a third of all non-UK residents visiting the UK enter via this airport, which also handles more than a fifth of all visits overseas by UK residents. Heathrow is also a cargo gateway and generally has up to 20 dedicated cargo aircraft using its facilities daily. DHL is the largest of these, and also leases cargo aircraft to BA for weekend operations.

The five main London airports – Heathrow, Gatwick, Stansted, London Luton, and London City airports – handle nearly 178.2 million terminal passengers per year, over 60 per cent of the national total. Gatwick Airport handled over 42.8 million terminal passengers in 2025, is the second largest airport in the country, and claims to be the busiest single-runway airport in Europe. As far as dedicated cargo services are concerned, Stansted and East Midlands airports have both experienced large growth in freight handling over the past decade, and these two airports are the major hubs for express freight operations.

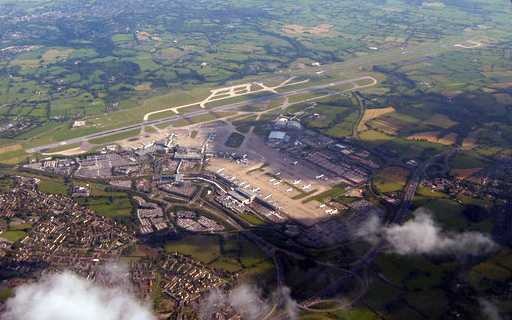
An aerial view of Manchester Airport

Outside London and the South East the use of regional airports has increased dramatically in recent years with the amount of air traffic using these facilities doubling in the period 1995 to 2005. For example, in the five years from 2001 passenger numbers at the regional Exeter Airport, Bristol Airport, and Newcastle Airport increased by 191 per cent, 113 per cent, and 60 per cent respectively. In the same period the largest airports experienced some of their slowest growth, with Heathrow passenger numbers increasing by 11 per cent and those at Gatwick increasing by less than 10 per cent.

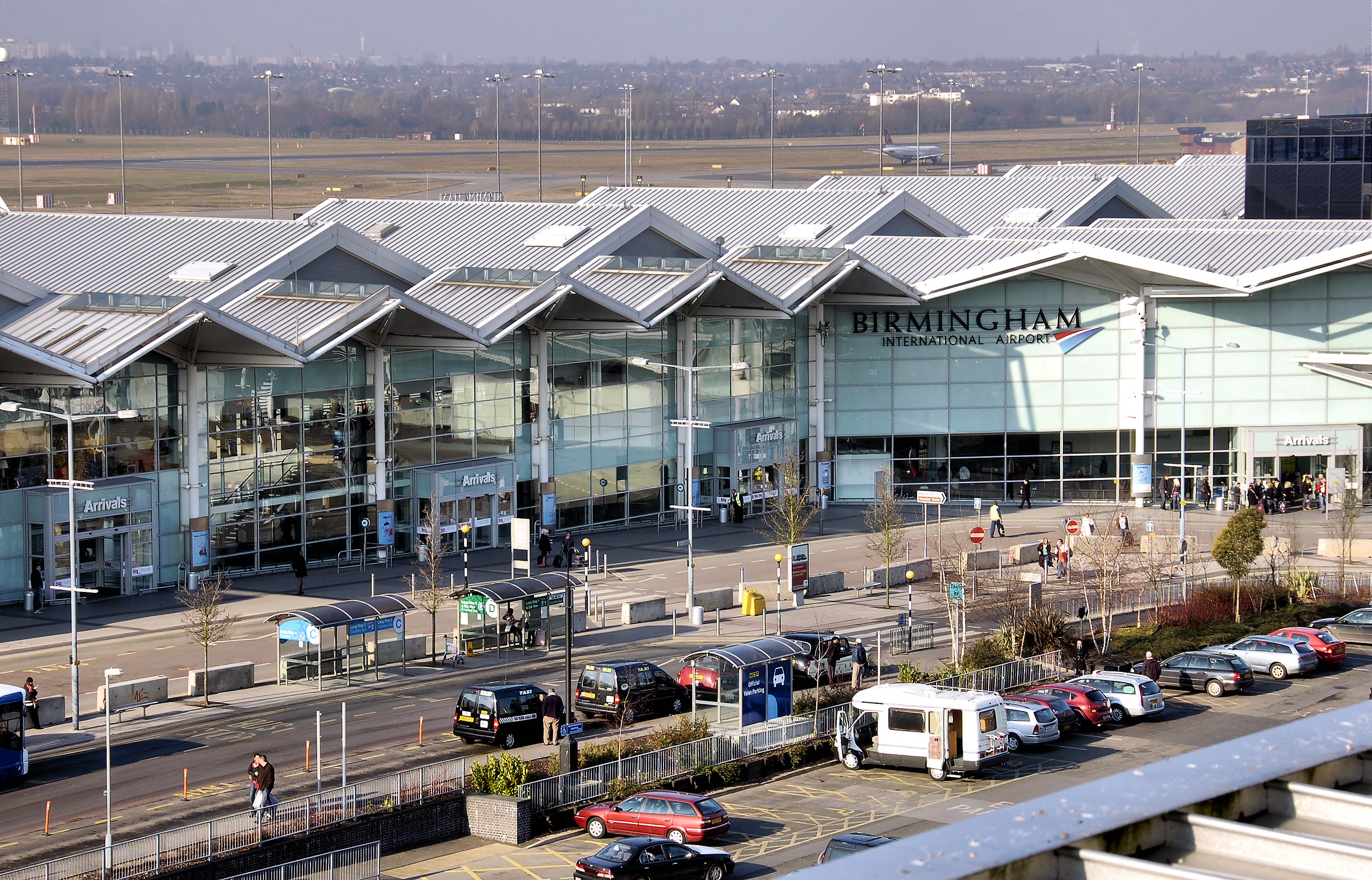
Terminal 2 at Birmingham Airport

== Airlines ==
The vast majority of passengers travelling to or from the UK by air are carried by the approximately 40 UK airlines, and at the end of 2006 the UK air transport fleet numbered 963 aircraft, flying just under 1.2 million flights per year and averaging over eight hours of flying daily.

The two largest airlines by passenger numbers – BA and easyJet – together account for nearly half of the 127 million passengers flown on UK airlines per year. In terms of both available and used capacity, BA is the largest airline, with Virgin Atlantic second, and easyJet in third place. BA passenger flights also account for over 50 per cent of all cargo carried by UK airlines, and when taken together with BA's dedicated cargo operations the airline carries over 60 per cent of all cargo carried by UK airlines.

== Passenger travel ==
Air travel is the most popular mode of transport for travel to and from the UK. In 2005 it was used for 80 per cent of all outbound visits by UK residents travelling overseas and by 74 per cent of all inbound visits. Just over a quarter of all air passengers travel on business, and the advent of no-frills carriers has led to significant growth in business travel from regional airports and more inbound trips by non-UK residents visiting friends and family. Whilst the no-frills carriers have been perceived to democratise air travel, providing the opportunity for lower income groups to travel more often, the main result is that middle and higher income groups travel more often and often for shorter trips.

Just over a fifth of all UK terminal passengers travel on domestic routes, while half travel between the UK and the rest of the European Union (EU). Travel between the UK and Spain, France, Germany, and Italy accounts for around half of the intra-EU travel, with Spain almost matching the other three countries combined in terms of passenger numbers. The US, the Far East, Switzerland, and the Middle East together account for just over half of all passengers flying between the UK and the rest of the world outside the EU, with the US exceeding the other three regions combined in terms of passenger numbers.

The United Kingdom has a low usage of internal domestic flights, and after a high in 2005/06 this has been in decline. In 2010 and 2011 just 18.4 million internal domestic passengers were carried compared with 1,352 million rail journeys in the same period. Air travel's share of passengers has reduced significantly on certain key routes. For example, for London to Manchester, rail's market share compared to air passenger journeys rose from 69 per cent in 2008 to 79 per cent in 2010; for Birmingham to Edinburgh, rail's market share rose from 14 per cent in 2008 to 31 per cent in 2010; and for London to Glasgow, rail's market share rose from 12 per cent in 2008 to 20 per cent in 2010. However, air still remains the leader on many London to Scotland journeys.

== Air transport policy ==
In December 2003 the government published The Future of Air Transport White Paper, which detailed the government's approach to the future development of air transport. The White Paper does not in itself authorise or preclude any development but seeks instead to define a "national strategic framework for the future development of airport capacity" over the next 30 years. The principal conclusion was that the two extremes of failing to provide additional airport capacity and encouraging growth without regard for the wider impacts are equally unacceptable options. Instead, a "balanced and measured approach" to the future of air transport in the UK was adopted.

The current airport capacity has been identified as an important constraint on the ability to meet the increasing demand for air travel. In many cases airport capacity is already fully used in meeting current demand. At Heathrow and Gatwick airports the runways are full for "... virtually the whole day", and passenger terminal capacity at Edinburgh Airport has reached its limit. Government forecasts in 2003 suggested that by 2030 the number of passengers could rise to between 400 and 600 mppa (million people per annum), representing a two to three fold increase, and a figure of 500 mppa by 2030 was regarded by the government as "robust". In 2006 the government reported that at 228 mppa the demand for air travel the previous year was in line with the 2003 forecast, but also revised the forecast demand for 2030 downwards to 465 mppa as a result of capacity constraints, even taking into account proposed airport developments.

The government's approach is also designed to cater for the forecast growth in demand, thus supporting economic prosperity nationally and enabling ordinary people to travel at reasonable cost. But at the same time there is a need to manage and mitigate the environmental impacts of aviation and ensure that the costs associated with them are reflected in the price of air travel. In December 2006 the government published the Air Transport White Paper Progress Report 2006 to report on progress made in "... delivering a sustainable future for aviation". The report reiterated the government's commitment to the strategy defined in the original White Paper, stating that it "... strikes the right balance between economic, social and environmental goals".

In 2010 the new Coalition Government abandoned the approach taken in the White Paper and ruled out further expansion of London's three main airports, Heathrow, Gatwick, and Stansted. On 31 October 2011 at the Airport Operators Association, the Labour Party's shadow transport secretary Maria Eagle announced that the Party had abandoned its support for a third runway at Heathrow Airport, but said that the government must also drop its moratorium on new airport capacity in the South East.

On 2 November 2011 the Thames Hub proposal was launched by Lord Foster, an attempt to integrate infrastructure components such as flood barriers, hydroelectric generation, and rail lines. It includes plans for one of the world's largest airports, capable of handling 150 million passengers a year on four runways, and to be built on a platform in the Hoo Peninsula in Kent.

== Environmental impact ==
Whilst carbon emissions from all UK activities other than aviation declined by 9 per cent in the 10 years between 1990 and 2000, carbon emissions from aviation activities doubled in the same period. Air transport in the UK accounted for 6.3 per cent of all UK carbon emissions in 2006, and when the radiative forcing impact of other emissions are taken into account the total impact of emissions attributable to aviation is estimated to be twice that of its carbon emissions alone. Although the government has committed to reducing total UK carbon emissions by 80 per cent from existing levels by 2050, its policy is based on the use of "... economic instruments to ensure that growing industries are catered for within a reducing total". Even if this reduction in total carbon emissions is achieved, research published in February 2006 concluded that aviation could still account for between 24 and 50 per cent of the UK's carbon budget by 2050.

The strategy adopted in the White Paper seeks to mitigate the global impact of air transport primarily through emissions trading schemes. Although the Kyoto Protocol implemented emissions trading as a means to reduce emissions at national levels, the global nature of air transport means that international (but not domestic) air travel is excluded from this mechanism. The government is seeking to redress this through the International Civil Aviation Organization (ICAO), but progress is slow. In the meantime, efforts are being made to include aviation in the EU Emission Trading Scheme, with an original target to implement this by 2008. In 2006 the government reaffirmed this policy as the best approach for addressing the climate change impacts of aviation, and aimed to accomplish this for all flights within the EU by 2011, with the scheme to be extended to include all flights to and from the EU the following year.

Critics of the government's policy advocate addressing climate change impacts by constraining demand for air travel. The study Predict and Decide - Aviation, climate change and UK policy concludes that the government should seek an alternative aviation policy based on managing demand rather than providing for it. This would be accomplished via a strategy that presumes "... against the expansion of UK airport capacity" and restrains demand by the use of economic instruments to price air travel less attractively. Other studies point to a significant contribution to aviation's climate change emissions by the social phenomenon of hypermobility, and the increasing prevalence of hypermobility among UK and global citizens. Key to the concerns expressed in these studies are that vast distances are easily travelled in a relatively short time, entailing substantial greenhouse gas emissions; that these emissions are made at altitude where they have much greater climate consequences than emissions made at ground level; and that social pressures and marketing programmes such as frequent-flyer programs both encourage a growing amount of travel as well as the means to do so.

In 2009 climate scientist Kevin Anderson of the Tyndall Centre for Climate Change Research demonstrated that continued annual growth in UK air travel at the usual seven per cent until 2012 and at three per cent thereafter will lead to such travel consuming 70 per cent of the UK's total planned national carbon emissions by 2030. In that less than business-as-usual scenario, UK air travel emissions would increase from 11 megatons (MT) in 2006 to 17 MT in 2012 and 28 MT in 2030. His contention is that the consequences of not promptly reducing the demand or supply for air travel in the UK and elsewhere will result in severe consequences for society and the ecosystems upon which humanity depends.

== See also ==
- 2010 eruption of Eyjafjallajökull
- Aerospace industry in the United Kingdom
- Aviation in the United Kingdom
- General aviation in the United Kingdom
- History of air traffic control in the United Kingdom
- History of British Airways
- International flight
- Jet Age
- Jet set
