= Timeline of the Royal Air Force =

British history timeline

== 1900–1918: The origins of the Royal Air Force ==
- 1901
  - 29 October – The Aero Club of Great Britain is established. In the following years many early military pilots are trained by members of the Club.
- 1905
  - 27 April – Sapper Moreton of the British Army's Balloon Section is lifted 2,600 ft (792 m) by a kite at Aldershot under the supervision of the kite's designer, Samuel Cody.
- 1908
  - Samuel Cody completes the first powered flight in the UK at Farnborough.
- 1909
  - The Aero Club establishes the first British flying ground near Leysdown in Kent.
  - 2 May – John Moore-Brabazon becomes the first Englishman to make an officially recognized aeroplane flight in England.
- 1910
  - The Aero Club moves its flying from Leysdown to the nearby Eastchurch.
  - June – Charles Rolls becomes the first Englishman to fly across the Channel.
- 1911
  - 1 April – Air Battalion, Royal Engineers formed at Larkhill.
  - December – The Royal Naval Flying School formed at Eastchurch, Kent.
- 1912
  - 13 April – The Royal Flying Corps (RFC) is established by Royal Warrant. An Air Committee to liaise between the Admiralty and the War Office is also created.
  - 13 May – RFC assume control of Air Battalion of the Royal Engineers and the Naval Air Service.
  - 19 June- Central Flying School (CFS) is formed at Upavon.
- 1914
  - 1 July – Royal Naval Air Service (RNAS) formed by splitting airship squadrons away from the RFC
  - September – The first RNAS aircraft squadrons formed. 1 Squadron RNAS at Antwerp, 2 Squadron RNAS at Eastchurch, 3 Squadron RNAS at St. Pol, France.
- 1916
  - 15 February – The Joint War Air Committee is established to co-ordinate the activities of the RFC and RNAS.
  - 15 May – The Air Board replaces the ineffective Joint War Air Committee.
  - 12 December – RFC expands to 106 front-line squadrons and 95 reserve and training squadrons.
- 1917
  - 29 November – The Air Force (Constitution) Act passed, providing for creation of an Air Force and an Air Ministry.

== 1918–1939: The inter-war years and policing the Empire ==
- 1918
  - 2 January – The Air Ministry comes into being with Lord Rothermere as Secretary of State for Air. Major-General Sir Hugh Trenchard becomes the first Chief of the Air Staff (CAS).
  - 1 April
    - The Royal Air Force is formed by amalgamating the RFC and RNAS.
    - First operational mission by the RAF carried out by 22 Squadron
    - Women's Royal Air Force (WRAF) formed.
  - 3 June – The Distinguished Flying Cross (DFC), Air Force Cross (AFC), Distinguished Flying Medal (DFM), Air Force Medal (AFM) are constituted.
  - 6 June – The Independent Air Force, the RAF's strategic bombing force, is formed.
  - June – Royal Air Force Temporary Nursing Service formed.
  - 19 July – The Imperial German Navy's airship base at Tønder is bombed in the Tondern raid
  - 19 September to 1 October – Battle of Megiddo. The RAF's Palestine Brigade plays a key role in the British victory over the Ottoman Empire, including the destruction of the Ottoman Seventh Army.
  - 11 November – At the end of the First World War, the RAF is the largest air force in the world with 27,333 officers, 263,837 other ranks, 22,647 aircraft, 103 airships, 133 front-line squadrons, 15 flights and 270 aerodromes overseas, 55 front-line squadrons, 75 training squadrons/depots, 401 aerodromes at home and 25,000 WRAF members.
- 1919
  - July – the R34 airship becomes the first aircraft to make an east to west transatlantic flight
  - August – RAF officer ranks are introduced.
- 1920
  - January to February – The defeat of Diiriye Guure and the "Mad Mullah". The beginnings of colonial air control as RAF aircraft acting with the Somaliland Camel Corps in British Somaliland overthrow the Dervish leaders.
  - 5 February – The RAF College Cranwell is established.
  - WRAF disbanded.
- 1921
  - 1 October – RAF military control of Mesopotamia begins.
- 1922
  - 17 February - RAF Ireland is formed by raising No. 11 (Irish) Wing to command status.
  - 1 October – RAF Iraq Command is formed.
- 1923
  - February - RAF Ireland is disbanded.
  - April - The RAF's first air trooping operation is conducted during the Kurdish uprising.
- 1924
  - 1 April - The Fleet Air Arm of the RAF is formed.
  - 9 October - The Auxiliary Air Force is instituted.
- 1925
  - 1 January - The Air Defence of Great Britain command is formed.
  - March to May – Pink's War. The RAF carries out its first independent air action, bombing and strafing the mountain strongholds of Mahsud tribesmen in Waziristan.
  - 1 and 11 October - The first University Air Squadrons were formed at Cambridge and Oxford universities respectively.
  - 29 October - The Observer Corps is formed.
- 1926
  - 1 March to 12 April - Wing Commander Conway Pulford carries out the first Cairo to Cape flight.
- 1927
  - 27 March - The RAF introduces its first all-metal fighter, the Armstrong Whitworth Siskin IIIA
- 1928
  - 23 December – The Kabul Airlift. The world's first air evacuation is carried out by the RAF when the British Legation in Kabul is flown to safety.
- 1929
  - 1 March - The Observer Corps is transferred to Air Ministry control.
- 1930
  - 1 January - RAF Far East Command is established.
- 1931
  - 29 September - Flight Lieutenant George Stainforth sets a new world air speed record of 407.5 mph and becomes the first man to exceed 400 mph.
- 1932
  - April to June – Following Sheikh Ahmad Barzani's small-scale revolt in north-east Iraq, the RAF conducts psychological and conventional air operations which result in Sheikh Ahmad's surrender.-
- 1933
  - 8 February - Squadron Leader Oswald Gayford and Flight Lieutenant Gilbert Nicholetts flying from RAF Cranwell to Walvis Bay in South Africa cover 5,309 miles, establishing a new world long distance record for nonstop flying.
- 1934
  - August - The RAF's first rotating-wing aircraft, the Avro Rota autogiro, enters service.
- 1935
  - 20 August - As part of the Mohmand campaign, No. 27 and No. 60 squadrons provide air support to British ground forces attempting to regain control of the area around the Gandab military road in the North-West Frontier.
- 1936
  - 14 July – The UK's air defences are reorganised into four commands: Bomber Command, Fighter Command, Coastal Command and Training Command.
- 1937 - The RAF conducts air attacks against the Fakir of Ipi and his followers during the Waziristan campaign
- 1938
  - 1 April – Maintenance Command is formed.
  - 1 November – Balloon Command is formed.

== 1939–1945: World War II ==
- 1939
  - 24 August – The Advanced Air Striking Force is formed in preparation for operations on the Continent
  - 3 September – Following the UK's declaration of war on Germany, the RAF conducts photographic reconnaissance of the German naval base at Wilhelmshaven.
  - 29 November – RAuxAF spitfires shoot down an He 111 bomber over Lothian, the first German aircraft to be shot down over the UK in World War II.
  - Women's Auxiliary Air Force (WAAF) instituted.
- 1940
  - 16 May – Air Chief Marshal Sir Hugh Dowding writes his letter to the Air Ministry which results in no further aircraft squadrons, earmarked for home defence, being sent to France.
  - 10 July – The Battle of Britain begins.
  - 13 August – Adlertag (Eagle Day). The Luftwaffe's attempts to gain air superiority over Britain fail, with the balance of aircraft losses being strongly in the RAF's favour.
- 1941
  - 15 May – The maiden flight of first British jet aircraft, the Gloster E.28/39.
  - 20 July – Ferry Command is formed.
  - 24 December – The Avro Lancaster enters service with the RAF.
- 1942
  - 30 May – Over 1,000 bombers set out to raid Cologne, severely damaging the city.
  - 1 June – Around 1,000 bombers set out to raid Essen, however many crews mistakenly bomb other cities.
  - 25 June – Around 1,000 bombers set out to raid Bremen, severely damaging the city and successfully bombing the Focke-Wulf aircraft factory.
- 1943
  - 5 March – In an effort to decimate the German industrial base, Bomber Command begins bombing the Ruhr region.
  - 25 March – Transport Command is formed by redesignating Ferry Command.
  - 16 May – Aircraft of 617 Squadron set out on Operation Chastise, commonly known as the Dambusters Raid. The Mohne and Eder dams are breached.
  - 18 November – This is the first night of a four-month bombing campaign against Berlin.
- 1944
  - 24 March – RAF and Dominion Air Force personnel are murdered by the Gestapo after the "great escape" from Stalag Luft III Prisoner of War Camp.
  - 6 June – D-Day commences. Diversions supplied by Avro Lancasters of 101 Squadron operating the ABC radio jamming equipment. Reconnaissance photographs were supplied by Spitfires of 16 Squadron.
- 1945
  - 22 February – Allied Air Forces launch Operation Clarion, a concerted effort to destroy German transportation within 24 hours.

== 1945–1990: The Cold War years ==
- 1948
  - 28 June 1948 to 30 September 1949 – The RAF conducts Operation Plainfare, the British contribution to the Berlin Airlift.
  - June – The RAF conducts Operation Firedog against Malayan terrorists during the Malayan Emergency. Two Spitfires of No. 60 Squadron fly the first offensive mission on 6 July, destroying an enemy base at Perak. Involvement continues until 1960.
- 1949
  - Women's Auxiliary Air Force becomes Women's Royal Air Force
- 1952
  - December - Flight Lieutenant John Nicholls shoots down a MiG 15 during the Korean War.
- 1953
  - Avro Lincoln squadrons flying out of RAF Eastleigh conduct anti-Mau Mau operations in Kenya. Operations continue until 1955.
- 1956
  - 31 October – Canberras fly reconnaissance sorties and bomb Egyptian airfields on the opening night of Suez War's air campaign.
- 1958
  - 3 November – Signals Command is formed.
- 1967
  - 1 August – Air Support Command is formed by redesignating Transport Command
- 1968
  - 30 April – Strike Command is formed from Fighter Command and Bomber Command.
  - 28 November – Coastal Command is absorbed into the newly created Strike Command.
- 1969
  - 1 January – Signals Command is absorbed into Strike Command.
- 1972
  - 1 September – Air Support Command is absorbed into Strike Command.
- 1982
  - 30 April – Operation Black Buck. Vulcan bombers set out from RAF Ascension Island on the first of six raids against Argentine positions in the Falkland Islands.
- 1985
  - 11 February 1985, the Langenbruck bus crash, in which 20 members of the RAF died
- 1986
  - 8 January – RAF Marine Branch disbanded.

== 1990–present: Expeditionary operations ==
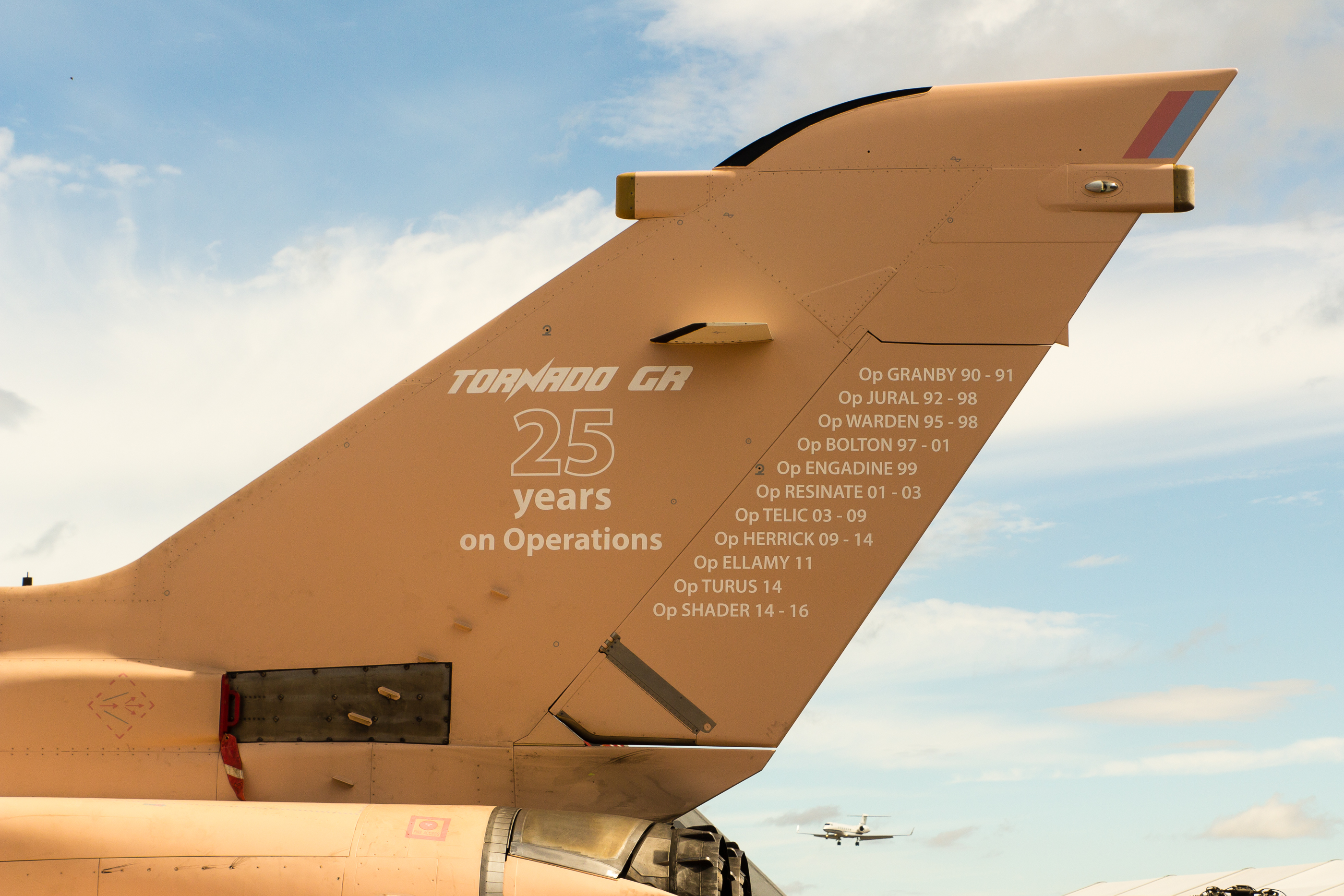
Tail of Tornado GR4 ZG750, marking 25 years of Tornado GR operations, at the 2016 Farnborough Airshow.

- 1990
  - RAF fighters based in Saudi Arabia and Kuwait prior to the Gulf War
- 1991
  - 16 January to 11 April – During the Gulf War, RAF aircraft fight in the air battle over Kuwait and Iraq.
  - The RAF begins Operations Resonate North and Resonate South, the British contribution to the Allied efforts to enforce the Iraqi no-fly zones. These operations continue for over a decade.
- 1993
  - RAF Tornado F3s and AWACS aircraft contribute to NATO's operation to restrict airspace movements over Bosnia and Herzegovina, Operation Deny Flight. The operation continues until late 1995.
- 1998
  - 16 December – Operation Desert Fox. RAF Tornados and USAF F-117s bomb military targets in Iraq.
- 2001
  - 9 October – During the third day of Operation Veritas, RAF aircraft commenced the provision of air-to-air refuelling, reconnaissance and surveillance support to US aircraft operating over Afghanistan.
- 2004
  - September – A detachment of six RAF Harriers from Joint Force Harrier was based at Kandahar Airfield to support coalition ground forces.
  - 30 October – 31 December – Four Tornado F3s deployed to Lithuania for the British rotation as part of NATO's Baltic Air Policing.
- 2005
  - RAF deployed to Indonesia following the 2004 Indian Ocean earthquake disaster to provide aid relief support and transport
- 2006
  - July – Three Chinook helicopters of 27 Squadron deployed to RAF Akrotiri to evacuate British citizens from Lebanon.
- 2007
  - April – Strike Command and Personnel and Training Command merge to form Air Command.
- 2016
  - 18 February - The RAF Search and Rescue Force is stood down.

== See also ==
- Timeline of aviation
- Timeline of British military aviation
