= Aviation in the United Kingdom =

Aviation in the United Kingdom refers to the activities surrounding mechanical flight in the United Kingdom, in both civilian and military contexts.

== History ==
The United Kingdom has a long history of pioneering aviation. The first recorded flight in the UK was by Italian aeronaut Vincenzo Lunardi in a hot air balloon in 1784. The Royal Engineers began experimenting with balloons for reconnaissance in the mid-19th century, with the "Pioneer" balloon in 1879. The Army Balloon Factory was established in 1890, and military balloon detachments were deployed in South Africa and Sudan. Though not the first in the British Empire, the first powered flight in the UK is credited to American Samuel Cody in 1908. This early experimentation paved the way for military aviation in the First World War and the formation of the Royal Air Force in 1918.

The British airship, HM Airship R34 was the first aircraft of any type to carry passengers across the Atlantic when on 2 July 1919 it left Scotland, travelled to New York and returned. The world's first daily international flight was established by the first British airline, Aircraft Transport and Travel (AT&T), in 1919, flying between London and Paris, a landmark in the birth of commercial aviation. The Air Ministry emphasised the importance of air travel for the future, drawing parallels with the Royal Navy's role in the past. The UK's aerospace industry benefited from research and development in the 1920s and 30s, particularly at Cambridge University and Imperial College. Development of new technology during World War II included the invention of the jet engine by Frank Whittle, a Cambridge graduate, which ushered in the jet age. Innovative British military aircraft designs after the war included the English Electric Canberra and the Avro Vulcan.

Post-war Britain saw the development of the first passenger jet aircraft, the de Havilland DH.106 Comet; the design flaws and requirements which it uncovered influenced the design of the Boeing 707. General aviation in the United Kingdom also flourished after the war with the introduction of light aircraft. Entering service in 1976, Concorde was an Anglo-French supersonic passenger jet, the first and only passenger airliner to commercially fly at supersonic speeds, primarily across the Atlantic. During the 1990s, the development of low-cost airlines and the European aviation market transformed air transport in the United Kingdom.

The aerospace industry in the United Kingdom is the second largest in the world, led by aerospace manufacturers such as Rolls-Royce and BAE Systems alongside a major commercial aviation sector, which includes British Airways and easyJet airlines. There are many airports in the United Kingdom, a subset of which operate scheduled commercial airline services and the busiest of these are located around London.

== Civil aviation ==
Civil aviation is conducted under the supervision of the Civil Aviation Authority (CAA), a statutory corporation which oversees and regulates all aspects of civil aviation in the United Kingdom. Its areas of responsibility include:

- Supervising the issuing of pilots' licences, testing of equipment, calibrating of navaids, and many other inspections (Civil Aviation Flying Unit).
- Managing the regulation of security standards, including vetting of all personnel in the aviation industry (Directorate of Aviation Security).
- Overseeing the national protection scheme for customers abroad in the event of a travel company failure (Air Travel Organisers' Licensing – ATOL).

The CAA is a public corporation of the Department for Transport, liaising with the government via the Standards Group of the Cabinet Office. Historically, the work of the CAA was previously carried out by the Ministry of Aviation, a department of the United Kingdom government established in 1959. Its responsibilities included the regulation of civil aviation and the supply of military aircraft, which it took on from the Ministry of Supply. In 1967, the Ministry of Aviation merged into the Ministry of Technology which took on the supply of military aircraft, while regulatory responsibilities were switched to the Board of Trade.

=== Air transport ===
Air transport in the United Kingdom is the commercial carriage of passengers, freight and mail by aircraft, both within the United Kingdom (UK) and between the UK and the rest of the world. In the past 25 years the industry has seen continuous growth, and the demand for passenger air travel in particular is forecast to increase from the current level of 236 million passengers to 465 million in 2030. One airport, London Heathrow Airport, is amongst the top ten busiest airports in the world. More than half of all passengers travelling by air in the UK currently travel via the six London area airports. Outside London, Manchester Airport is by far the largest and busiest of the remaining airports, acting as a hub for the 20 million or so people who live within a two-hour drive. Regional airports have experienced the most growth in recent years, due to the success of 'no-frills' airlines over the last decade. In 2013, the UK had the third highest number of passengers carried of any country, behind only the United States and China.

=== General aviation ===
Outside of air transport, general aviation in the United Kingdom has been defined as a civil aircraft operation other than a commercial air transport flight operating to a schedule or military aviation. Although the International Civil Aviation Organization (ICAO) excludes any form of remunerated aviation from its definition, some commercial operations are often included within the scope of general aviation (GA) in the UK. The sector operates business jets, rotorcraft, piston and jet-engined fixed-wing aircraft, gliders of all descriptions, and lighter than air craft. Public transport operations include business (or corporate) aviation and air taxi services, and account for nearly half of the economic contribution made by the sector. Other commercial GA activities are aerial work, such as surveying and air ambulances, and flight training, which plays an important role in the supply of pilots to the commercial air transport (CAT) industry. Private flying is conducted for personal transport and recreation. It includes a strong vintage aircraft movement, and encompasses a range of air sports, such as racing, aerobatics, and parachuting, at which British teams and individuals have succeeded in international competition.

Organisations in the United Kingdom describe GA in less restrictive terms that include elements of commercial aviation. The British Business and General Aviation Association interprets it to be "all aeroplane and helicopter flying except that performed by the major airlines and the Armed Services". The General Aviation Awareness Council applies the description "all Civil Aviation operations other than scheduled air services and non-scheduled air transport operations for remuneration or hire". For the purposes of a strategic review of GA in the UK, the Civil Aviation Authority (CAA) defined the scope of GA as "a civil aircraft operation other than a commercial air transport flight operating to a schedule", and considered it necessary to depart from the ICAO definition and include aerial work and minor CAT operations.

Of the 21,000 civil aircraft registered in the UK, 96 per cent are engaged in GA operations, and annually the GA fleet accounts for between 1.25 and 1.35 million hours flown. The single most common class of aircraft is the fixed-wing light aircraft associated with traditional GA, but the main area of growth over the last 20 years has been in the use of more affordable aircraft, such as microlights, amateur built aeroplanes, and smaller helicopters. There are 28,000 Private Pilot Licence holders, and 10,000 certified glider pilots. Some of the 19,000 pilots who hold professional licences are also engaged in GA activities. Although GA operates from more than 1,800 aerodromes and landing sites, ranging in size from large regional airports to farm strips, over 80 per cent of GA activity is conducted at 134 of the larger aerodromes. The GA industry, which is around 7 per cent the size of the CAT industry, employs 12,000 people, and contributes £1.4 billion to the UK economy.

==== Police aviation ====
Police aviation in the United Kingdom provides the British police with an aerial support unit to assist them in pursuit, surveillance and tracking. All police aviation in England and Wales comes under the National Police Air Service (NPAS), while Police Scotland and the Police Service of Northern Ireland operate independent units. While in the past, only a few units have operated fixed-wing planes, NPAS has introducing several more to strengthen the national fleet. These light aircraft also allow for longer flying time and lower running costs. The PSNI is unique in that it, currently, is the only force to operate an aeroplane. Police aviation in England and Wales was once a force-by-force, or forces working in partnership, organisation, however from April 2012 it gradually became centralised as the National Police Air Service. The final force to join, the Metropolitan Police, joined in 2015.

==== Air ambulances ====
Air ambulance services in the United Kingdom are mostly operated by charities and integrated with the National Health Service.

== Military aviation ==
Military aviation in the United Kingdom encompasses the aviation activities of the three branches of the British Armed Forces, primarily the Royal Air Force as well as the Fleet Air Arm of the Royal Navy and the Army Air Corps of the British Army. In addition, it includes the military aviation activities of the armed forces of allied countries operating in the United Kingdom, in particular, the United States Air Force in the United Kingdom.

The Military Aviation Authority (MAA) regulates UK defence aviation activity, ensuring safety and adherence to regulations.

== See also ==
- Environmental effects of aviation in the United Kingdom
