= Bursledon Brickworks Museum =

Bursledon Brickworks Industrial Museum
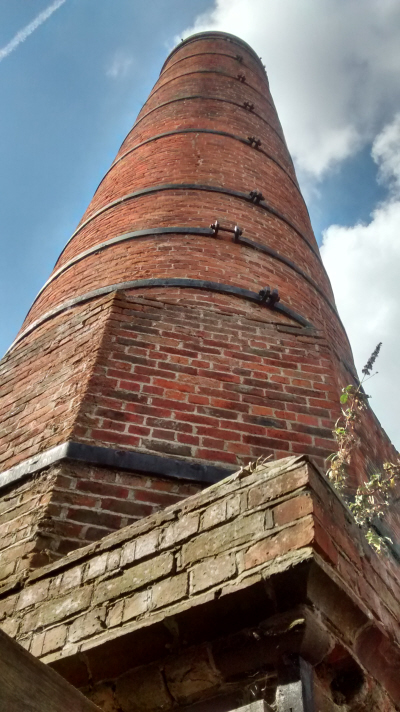

- Location within Hampshire
- Former names: Hooper & Ashby (1897–1903); The Bursledon Brick Co. Limited (1903–1959); The Sussex & Dorking Brick Company (year unknown); Redland Holdings Ltd (1959–1974); Bursledon Brickworks Conservation Centre (1995/96–2000s); Bursledon Brickworks Industrial Museum (2012–2017); The Brickworks Museum (2017–)

General information
- Type: Museum
- Architectural style: Victorian
- Location: Swanwick, Hampshire, England, Coal Park Lane / Swanwick Lane, Southampton, England
- Coordinates: 50°53′09″N 1°17′27″W
- Elevation: 11 m (36 ft)
- Owner: Hampshire Buildings Preservation Trust

Technical details
- Floor count: 2

Design and construction
- Awards: Solent Protection Society 2004 Conservation Award; Tourism South East / Beautiful South Business Awards: Best Community Tourism Business 2014; Small Visitor Attraction of the Year (Bronze) 2014, 2017 (Silver); IMECH Industrial Heritage Award; TripAdvisor Certificate of Excellence 2015, 2016; Fareham In Bloom: Business Parks and Commercial Landscape (Silver) 2018; Wildlife Garden (Silver Gilt) 2018

Website
- www.bursledonbrickworks.org.uk

The Brickworks Museum, also known as Bursledon Brickworks, is a volunteer-run museum in Swanwick, Hampshire, England. It is described as the UK's sole surviving Victorian steam-driven brickworks.

The brick kiln, chimney, drying sheds, and the boiler and engine house at the south section of the brickworks are listed Grade II* as a group on the National Heritage List for England.

== History ==
=== Hooper & Ashby ===
Bursledon Brickworks were built in 1897 by Robert and Edward Ashby. The Ashby family were partners in Hooper & Ashby, a Southampton-based builders' merchants. Both the Ashbys and the Hoopers were Quakers, from Staines in Middlesex. Edward Hooper, began the original business. He moved to Southampton at the age of 26 in the early 1850s. In the early days, he appears in the various business directories as a civil engineer/architect. At some point his brother, Charles, joined him and they began making bricks. These were sold under the name Hooper & Co. Edward soon saw an opportunity to set up a larger business and took out a lease on Baltic Wharf in Chapel Road. Here he began trading as a builders' merchant selling all kinds of materials including their own bricks. This proved to be successful. In the mid 19th century Southampton was expanding rapidly. He outgrew the first warehouse and took out a second lease for American Wharf. In 1860 Edward married Harriet Ashby and her brother, Edmund joined the business a year later and it was renamed: Hooper & Ashby. It went on to be very successful with stores all along the south coast.

=== The Ashby family ===
By 1885, Edward Hooper had died leaving the Ashby family to run both the brick-making and builders merchants businesses. Seeing the market for large numbers of bricks opening up in the area they opened a new brickyard in Chandlers Ford. Here they concentrated on making large numbers of machine-made bricks. This was a successful strategy and they only moved when the clay started to run out. The bricks were still being made under the name Hooper & Co.

They started to explore options open to them and eventually settled on a site at Lower Swanwick. This was on the banks of the River Hamble and had plenty of 'brick earth'. The silty clay from the river had mixed over millions of years with sand from the sea creating a very deep seam of sandy clay - perfect for brick making. In 1897 the new brickworks were built and started producing their first bricks.

== The brickworks ==
The new brickworks were innovative for their time. They used a large brick-making machine made by Bennett & Sayer from Derby. They were a firm that specialised in making large clay handling machinery. The machine the Ashby brothers bought was of the type known as a stiff clay extruder. The manufacturers claimed it was capable of making 40,000 bricks a day. The machine was run by a steam engine manufactured by John Wood & Co from Wigan.

Once the bricks were made they were dried in large drying sheds. These were heated via underfloor pipes and the bricks took a set time to dry. The design of the drying sheds was patented by the company. When they had dried completely the bricks were then taken down to the kiln.

The kiln was a Staffordshire-type, continuous kiln (based on a Hoffmann kiln) with twelve chambers. Each chamber could hold up to 26,000 bricks at a time. The kiln was always burning with the chambers going from cold to over 1,000°C every 15 days or so.

In 1903, the brickworks changed its name to The Bursledon Brick Co. Limited or (B.B.C. Ltd.). This coincided with the extension of the southern complex and the addition of another complete works to the north. Additional capacity was built in 1935, and the site was producing more than 20 million bricks each year. The company later merged with the Sussex and Dorking Brick Company, and was renamed Redland Holdings in 1959.

=== The workers ===
The men who worked in the brickworks mostly lived nearby. Most of them worked as labourers, either digging clay, making bricks, or tending the kiln. All of these jobs were physically demanding. They worked in gangs and were paid according to the number of bricks they contributed each day. The pace they set was fast as they were keen to earn as much as possible. The pay was good in comparison with other labouring jobs in the area. There was competition from the local market gardens (growing the strawberries for London) and the various boatyards on the River Hamble. Neither of these paid as well as the Brickworks did, as long as you could keep up the pace.

The clay gang dug the clay from the clay pits. This work was dependent on the weather. If it were wet or dry, they wouldn't be able to dig as much clay as usual. Their pay could vary from 10s to 30s a week. The clay was taken to the machine using narrow-gauge railway wagons. These were hauled up an inclined plane to the top of the brick-making machine.

The machine gang were responsible for getting the bricks from the machine and into the drying sheds. They used wooden barrows to do this, pushing 40 bricks at a time. They ran approximately 15 miles a day with their barrows up and down the long corridors that divided the drying sheds. It was hot work as the drying sheds operated at around 25°C.

When the bricks were dry, the kiln gang took over, and their job was to take the bricks on barrows (50 at a time now) down to the kiln and stack the kiln chambers. This was the hardest job as the kiln chambers were still very hot and filled with the fumes from the coal burning. They earned more than anyone else on site, but it was hard work.

=== Sport ===
On 20 March, Bursledon Brickworks F.C. beat North Warnborough 4–1 in the semi-finals of the 1926 Hants Junior Cup. The cricket team, Lower Swanwick B.C.C. won the Sarisbury and District Cricket League Division 2 championship shield in 1908.

=== Closure of the brickworks ===
The brickworks closed in 1974, and the site was later saved from demolition by the Hampshire Buildings Preservation Trust. The south section of Bursledon Brickworks which houses the brick kiln, chimney, drying sheds, boiler and engine house are Grade II* listed. The north section was demolished and the land was acquired by the National Air Traffic Services. NATS operate the London Area Control Centre and London Terminal Control Centre. As site owners, they have provided funding for the Swanwick Lakes Wildlife Reserve project managed by the Hampshire and Isle of Wight Wildlife Trust.

== Museum ==
=== Charity status ===
The Bursledon Brickworks Trust which ran from July 1997 – February 2007 was replaced by the Bursledon Brickworks Museum Trust in November 2016. The museum has charitable status.

=== Grants ===
In 2012, the Heritage Lottery Fund granted Hampshire Buildings Preservation Trust funding of £666,300 to create the museum. The museum opened in 2014. It is now fully accredited and open to the public three days a week from April through to October.

In 2023, Historic England awarded the museum £246,000 to fund the replacement of the asbestos roof over the site's brick kiln.

=== Collections ===
The largest part of the collection is the museum itself. It still has all its original buildings and working machinery. Since its inception the collection has broadened and is now has one of the largest collections of bricks and brick-making artefacts in the UK.

The working machine is kept in working condition and is steamed up once a month for special events. The original boilers no longer work and steam is generated via a modern boiler.

In 2022 the museum obtained permission from Fareham Borough Council to replace the asbestos roof over the brick kiln.

=== Steam, buses and railways ===
The Southampton and District Transport Heritage Trust keep a collection of heritage buses on the site. They help the museum by providing a bus service for some of the events during the year. Likewise, Southampton Historic Steam and Engineering Society are based on the museum site. They create two large steam based events each year with visiting traction engines.

The museum has both a narrow-gauge railway and a miniature railway on site. The narrow-gauge runs as part of larger museum events. A diesel shunter and rolling stock is used to demonstrate how the railway once operated. The miniature railway also runs at events and offers rides for children.

=== Entrance to and from the site ===
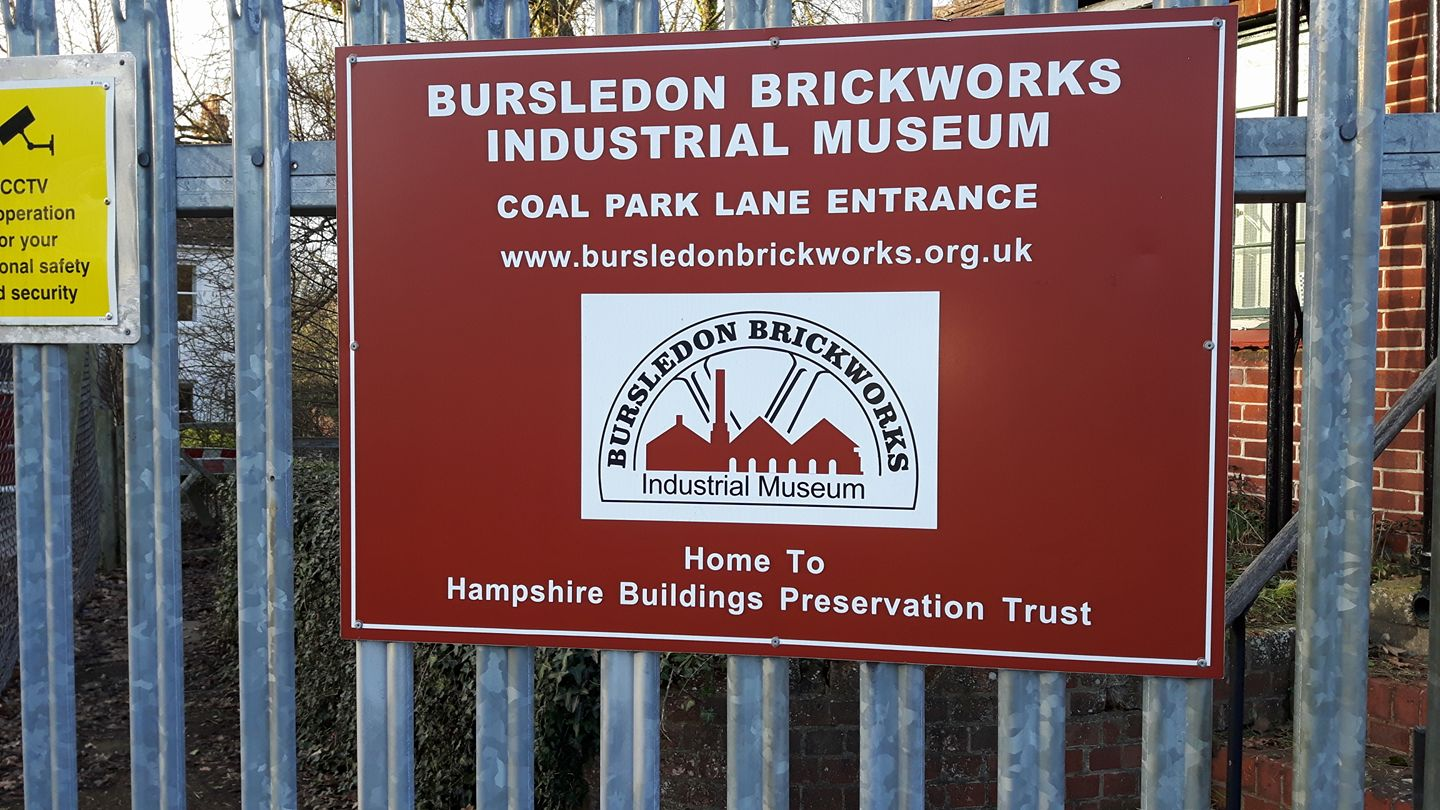
Coal Park Lane entrance in February 2017

The brickworks has two entrances; the first is on Swanwick Lane, and the second on Coal Park Lane. The Swanwick Lane entrance has access to a car park for use by the general public. It is also where coaches drop off passengers. The rear entrance on Coal Park Lane is for use by staff and volunteers at the site; it is also used for deliveries.

== Radio and television ==
In July 2015, BBC Radio Solent presenter Nick Girdler visited the brickworks to unveil a new brick sculpture, affectionately known as the Twisted Shard. The structure, which took 5 months to build, was designed by local brick lecturer and artist Joe Taylor from Woolston, Southampton, in partnership with Michelmersh Brick Holdings. He enlisted the help of some of his Southampton City College students to aid in the construction of the Twisted Shard. Later that same year, the brickworks was featured in the last five minutes of BBC South Today's – VE Day: First Days of Peace documentary.

In January 2017, a five-minute segment on Bursledon Brickworks featured on Series 14: Episode 6 of the BBC One television programme Antiques Road Trip. A month later, the museum welcomed wine connoisseur Peter Richards from Saturday Kitchen.
