= RAF Prestwick =

Former Royal Air Force station in South Ayrshire, Scotland (1936–2013)

RAF Prestwick
- Prestwick, South Ayrshire in Scotland
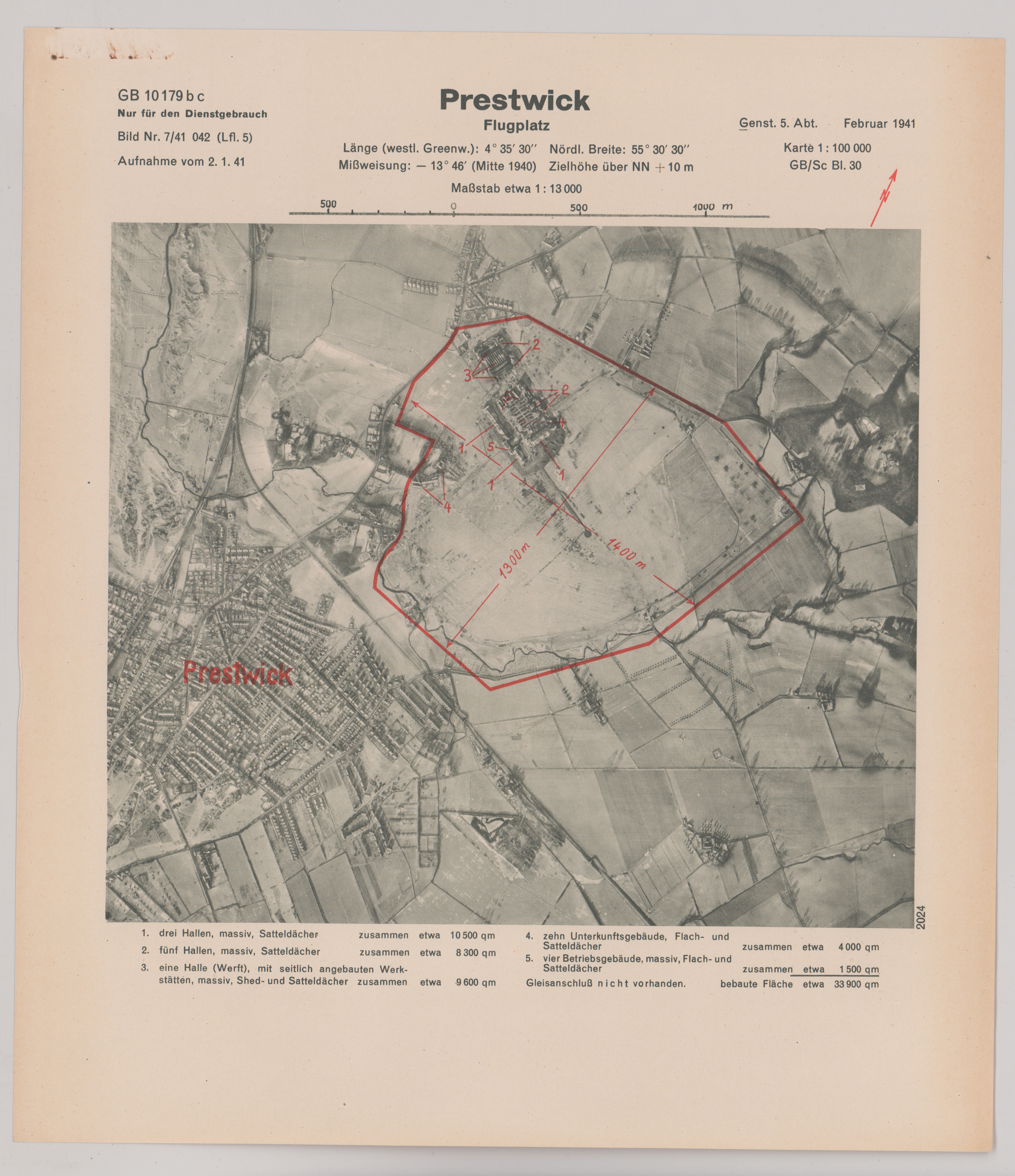
- RAF Prestwick on a target dossier of the German Luftwaffe, 1941

- Faire Agus Gliocas (Scottish Gaelic: Watchfulness and Wisdom)

Site information
- Type: Military air traffic control centre
- Code: PW
- Owner: Ministry of Defence
- Operator: Royal Air Force
- Condition: Closed

Location
- Location within South Ayrshire RAF Prestwick (the United Kingdom)
- Coordinates: 55°29′48″N 004°35′33″W

Site history
- Built: 1936
- In use: February 1936 – 2013
- Fate: Operations transferred to RAF (U) Swanwick.
- Battles/wars: European theatre of World War II; Cold War

Garrison information
- Past commanders: Wing Commander Bruce Duncan (final station commander)

Airfield information
- Elevation: 11 metres (36 ft) AMSL
Runways
Direction	Length and surface
00/00	Concrete
00/00	Concrete

Royal Air Force Prestwick or simply known as RAF Prestwick, is a former Royal Air Force station based at the NATS air traffic control centre, adjacent to Glasgow Prestwick Airport, South Ayrshire, in south west Scotland. The unit was home to the Scottish Air Traffic Control Centre (Military) which provided an air traffic control service to military aircraft operating within its area of responsibility. Prestwick was also home to a Distress and Diversion (D&D) Cell which provided assistance to both military and civil aircraft in an emergency.

RAF Prestwick was established during the Second World War for the reception of aircraft coming across the Atlantic from North America.

The unit closed in December 2013 with operations transferring to the RAF unit at London Area Control Centre in Swanwick, Hampshire.

== History ==
Prestwick Airport was established on 17 February 1936 as a base for Scottish Aviation Limited.

=== Second World War ===
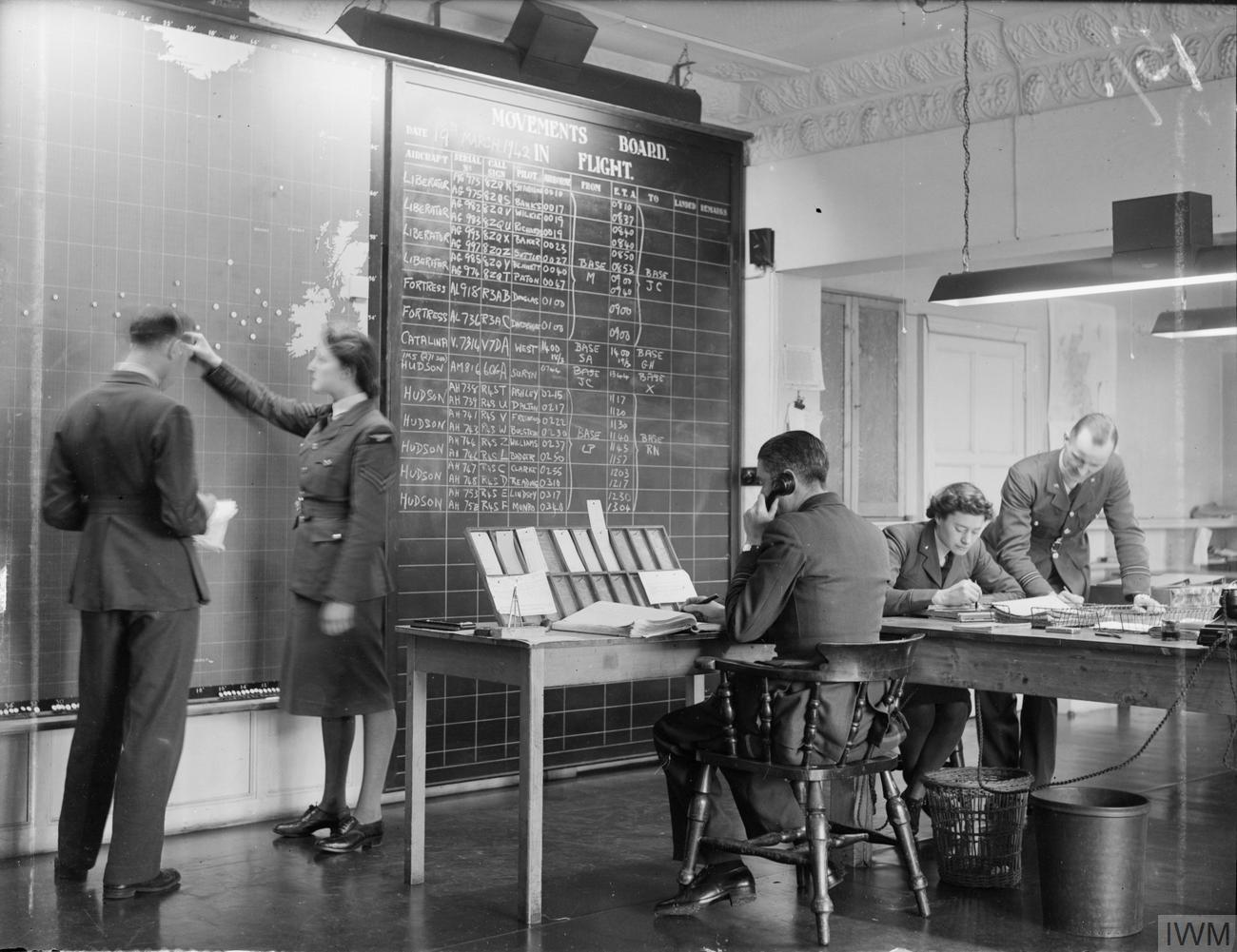
Personnel at work in the Operations Room of the Atlantic Ferry Service at RAF Prestwick.

During the Second World War, Prestwick was used an eastern terminus for the North Atlantic air ferry route, one of a series of routes over which military aircraft were ferried from the United States and Canada to Great Britain, to support the war in Europe. A large number of heavy bombers, fighter aircraft and aircraft carrying diplomatic and VIP passengers transited through the airfield.

RAF Ferry Command was formed on 20 July 1941 to take control of North Atlantic ferry flights but became part RAF Transport Command on 25 March 1943, with the role becoming the responsibility of No. 45 (Atlantic Ferry) Group. Ferry flights were initially controlled by the Overseas Movement Control Centre, operating from a location in Gloucestershire. As the number of flights increased, Trans-Atlantic Air Control (TAC) was relocated in November 1941 to Redbrae House, a mock Tudor home located near Prestwick Airport. A large United States military presence was established at Prestwick to support the ferry flights from North America.

In late 1944, a Flying Control Centre was established in Redbrae House, providing an area control service for the region. The centre was operated by a combination of British, Canadian and American military personnel until the end of the Second World War in 1945.

After the war, responsibility for TAC came under the control of RAF Transport Command after the United States Army Air Forces (USAAF) presence dramatically reduced. The centre at Redbrae House, previously operated by an international alliance of military personnel, was transferred to the Ministry of Civil Aviation and the Oceanic Area Control Centre was created.

=== Post war ===
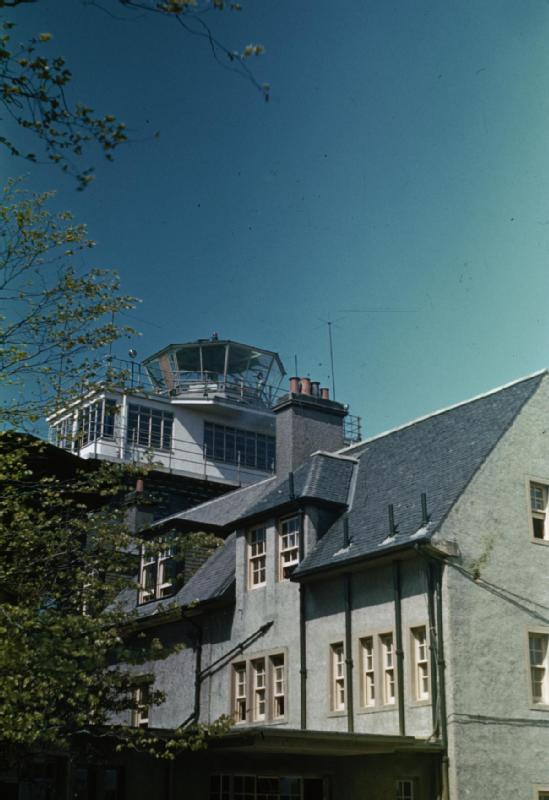
The air traffic control tower at Prestwick during 1944.

In November 1947, the RAF regional control centre was re-designated Scottish Traffic Control Centre (Military) (ScATCC(Mil)) to control military aircraft flying within the airspace above Scotland. Around the same time, a civilian air traffic control service began to meet the demand from the expanding civil aviation market. The unit was staffed by RAF Air Traffic Control Officers and Air Traffic Control Assistants. Both military and civilian aircraft were controlled by RAF controllers who provided a variety of air traffic services predominantly outside controlled airspace or within airspace designated as Military Training Areas. A Distress and Diversion (D&D) cell was co-located with ScATCC (Mil), tasked with assisting aircraft in distress and/or encountering emergency situations.

In April 1977, the D&D cell and the Air Defence Notification Centre (North) (ADNC) moved into new premises at Atlantic House, followed by ScATCC (Mil) on 2 November 1978. ADNC (North) closed on 31 March 1997, with approximately 65 RAF staff remaining at Prestwick.

The Freedom of the South Ayrshire was awarded to RAF Prestwick on 17 July 2009. In November of that year, the unit moved to the new NATS Prestwick Centre, built adjacent to Atlantic House, which accommodates the NATS civilian controllers providing oceanic and Scottish area control services.

The Prestwick Distress & Diversion Cell closed in December 2012 when D&D operations moved to RAF Swanwick in Hampshire.

== Role and operations ==
Prior to its closure, RAF Prestwick's mission statement was "To contribute effectively to the delivery of airpower by assisting with the protection of the integrity of the UK’s airspace and being at the forefront of excellence in the provision of the air traffic control, airspace management and support services." The main responsibilities of RAF Prestwick was to provide air traffic control (ATC) services to military aircraft carrying out the following activities.

- Flying between 25,000 ft and 66,000 ft
- Crossing the national airways system
- On transit flights operating below 25,000 ft outside controlled airspace
- On operations (such as air-to-air refuelling)

The Distress and Diversion (D&D) Cell was one of two D&D Cells (the other RAF (U) Swanwick) established to provide assistance to both military and civil aircraft experiencing an emergency. The cell maintained a continuous listening watch on both guard frequencies, 121.5 MHz for civilian aircraft and 243.0 MHz for military aircraft and was responsible for co-ordinating responses within UK airspace north of Newcastle and contacting the Aeronautical Rescue Co-ordination Centre (ARCC), which at the time was based at RAF Kinloss in Moray.

The unit at RAF Prestwick was parented by RAF Leuchars in Fife.

== Units ==
The following units were based at RAF Prestwick at some point:

- No. 1 Civil Air Navigation School RAF (August 1938 - November 1939) became No. 1 Air Observers Navigation School RAF (November 1939 - July 1941)
- 'D' Flight of No. 1 (Coastal) Operational Training Unit RAF (August - November 1940)
- 'D' Flight of No. 2 (Coastal) Operational Training Unit RAF (November 1940 - July 1941)
- No. 2 Supplementary School of Wireless Telegraphy RAF (September 1939 - October 1940)
- No. 3 Radio School RAF (December 1940 - August 1942) became No. 3 Radio Direction Finding School RAF (August - December 1942)
- No. 4 Ferry Pilots Pool ATA (September 1940 - January 1942) & (August 1942 - October 1945)
- No. 4A Ferry Pilots Pool ATA (January - August 1942)
- No. 4B Ferry Pilots Pool ATA (January - August 1942)
- Detachment of No. 6 Anti-Aircraft Co-operation Unit RAF (March - June 1941)
- Detachment of No. 7 Anti-Aircraft Co-operation Unit RAF (January - May 1941)
- No. 10 Air Observers Navigation School RAF (November - December 1939) disbanded into No. 1 Air Observers Navigation School RAF
- No. 12 Elementary and Reserve Flying Training School RAF (February 1936 - September 1939) became No. 12 Elementary Flying Training School RAF (September 1939 - March 1941)
- No. 1425 (Communication) Flight RAF (October 1941 - April 1942)
- No. 1527 (Beam Approach Training) Flight RAF (October 1941 - September 1945) became No. 1527 (Radio Aids Training) Flight RAF (September 1945 - February 1946)
- No. 1680 (Western Isles Communications) Flight RAF (March - April 1944) became No. 1680 (Transport) Flight RAF (April 1944 - February 1946)

Squadrons

- No. 102 (Ceylon) Squadron RAF (1940)
- No. 114 (Hong Kong) Squadron RAF (1919)
- No. 141 Squadron RAF (1940)
- No. 253 (Hyderabad State) Squadron RAF (1940)
- No. 263 (Fellowship of the Bellows) Squadron RAF (1940)
- No. 600 (City of London) Squadron AAF (1940-41)
- No. 602 (City of Glasgow) Squadron AAF (1940)
- No. 603 (City of Edinburgh) Squadron AAF (1939-40)
- No. 610 (County of Chester) Squadron AAF (1940)
- No. 615 (County of Surrey) Squadron AAF (1940)

USAF 67th Air Rescue Squadron, later 67th Special Operations Squadron 7 November 1953-18 March 1960 and 18 June 1961-1966

== Heritage ==
The station badge showed a Lion, (symbolising strength and valour), holding a shepherd's crook, (symbolising watchfulness), within a turret, (symbolising a place of refuge, strength and safety).

The station motto, Faire Agus Gliocas, is Scottish Gaelic for "Watchfulness and Wisdom".

== Closure ==
The Minister for the Armed Forces announced on 31 March 2013 that RAF Prestwick would close by the end of 2013. Due to technological advances, there was no longer a requirement for two military area radar control centres in the United Kingdom.The unit subsequently closed on 6 December 2013, when the RAF Ensign was lowered for the final time, representing the end of a 77-year association between Ayrshire and the RAF. Prestwick's operations and thirty personnel were transferred to the RAF unit based in the NATS London Air Traffic Control Centre in Swanwick, Hampshire, forming a single military area radar unit. A small number of RAF personnel remained at Prestwick until January 2014 to complete the transfer.

== See also ==
- List of former Royal Air Force stations
- Armed forces in Scotland
- Military history of Scotland
