= RAF West Drayton =

Former RAF Base in Middlesex, England

Coordinates: 51.5049°N 0.4615°W

- Station badge
- Active: c. 1918 to 1994
- Country: United Kingdom
- Branch: Royal Air Force; Royal Naval Air Service
- Garrison/HQ: West Drayton (Stockley), Middlesex
- Motto: "Protect"
- Royal Air Force Ensign

RAF West Drayton was a non-flying Royal Air Force station in West Drayton, within the London Borough of Hillingdon, which served as the main centre for military air traffic control in the United Kingdom. It was co-located with the civilian London Air Traffic Control Centre to provide a vital link between civil and military flying and airspace requirements. Following the departure of the remaining civil and military air traffic control systems by 2008, the site was closed and demolished for a new residential development.

== History ==
=== RNAS/RAF Construction Depot ===
- In January 1918 three hundred Royal Naval Air Service (RNAS) personnel were stationed at Stockley in the Yiewsley Urban District.
- The RNAS West Drayton depot was established as the main base for the RNAS Air Construction Corps (ACC), having a Repair Shop, two Stores, Packing and Receiving Rooms, Officers' Mess and Quarters, Executive Office, Sergeants' Mess and Quarters for the men.
- The Corps was renamed the Air Service Constructional Corps and by the end of the war renamed again as the RAF Air Construction Service (ACS).
- In October 1920 the Yiewsley Urban District Council and the Uxbridge Rural District Council requested that the depot accommodation buildings at Stockley that had been used by the RNAS, be used for the housing of demobilised soldiers and sailors. However this was declined by the Secretary of State for War and Air, Winston Churchill.
- Between 1920 and 1923 public sales by auction of large quantities of the depot stores were held on behalf of the U.K. Government.

=== RAF Reception Depot ===
- On 1 September 1924 the West Drayton RAF Station became a reception depot for new entrants. Wing Commander Alexander Shekleton D.S.O. took command of the depot.
- On 30 October 1939 it became a Women's Auxiliary Air Force (WAAF) new-entrant depot.

=== Post Second World War ===
- The station was used to house 700 athletes competing at the 1948 Summer Olympics in London, together with RAF Uxbridge and Richmond.
- From 1951 until 1962 the station accommodated the 3911th Air Base Group United States Air Force in addition to RAF personnel.

=== Air Traffic Control Operations ===
View across the site

The station became a unit of No. 11 Group RAF in January 1965.

RAF West Drayton was also the home of the Linesman System, hence the main Operations Building being known as the L1. The system used Link 1 to exchange Air Defence data between the UK and Europe. There were links to Continental Early Warning (CEW) sites at: Reitan, Maakeroy, Vaedbek, Nieuw-Milligen, Glons and Doulons.

Aerospace System Operators (ASOps or Scopies) were responsible for the tracking and identification of every flight – military and civil, that entered or left the UK Air Defence Region (UKADR). This was a labour-intensive task in the days before automatic initiation and tracking systems, but a big improvement on the plotting table and small perspex plaques with information written on them. The School of Fighter Control continued to teach plotting and writing backwards until 1990.

The School of Fighter Control moved to RAF West Drayton from RAF Bawdsey, training junior officers to be Fighter Controllers. In addition to teaching RAF officers, foreign and commonwealth students also attended, and there was even one course of Yugoslavian MiG pilots.

The station also became responsible for collecting and analysing many reports of UFOs after information was received by the Ministry of Defence.

=== Closure and redevelopment ===
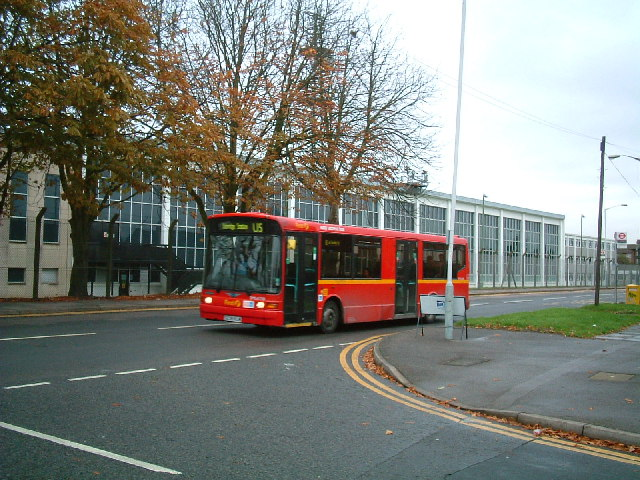
A London bus passes the RAF West Drayton complex in 2005

West Drayton ceased being an RAF station in April 1994. At this time the English Electric Lightning acting as a gate guardian was scrapped; only the nose section was retained and sent to the Malta Aviation Museum. Air traffic control services remained, although the section responsible for airspace outside London moved to Swanwick in Hampshire in 2002. The remaining operation was named the London Terminal Control Centre. RAF personnel remained on the site, as military air traffic control functions for the eastern side of England remained. In November 2007 the remaining civil air traffic control services moved to Swanwick and were joined by the military operation in January 2008. National Air Traffic Services vacated the site in 2008. The MT section of the Queen's Colour Squadron relocated to RAF Northolt.

Plans for 773 homes, a nursing home, shops and offices were approved by the London Borough of Hillingdon in July 2010. Inland Homes named the new development "Drayton Garden Village", aiming to create a 1930s style village. Demolition work of the former air traffic control site was carried out between 2010 and 2011. The Drayton Garden Village development opened officially on 21 October 2011, with a ceremony led by the Mayor of Hillingdon. A later housing development, Park West, was constructed on the western side of the site.

== See also ==
- Linesman/Mediator
- London Area Control Centre
- ACE High
