= Soluforce =

SoluForce is a type of Reinforced Thermoplastic Pipe (RTP, also known as flexible composite pipe or FCP).

== Introduction ==
SoluForce is a brand name of Pipelife Nederland B.V. (part of Wienerberger AG), with its main offices and production facilities located in Enkhuizen, The Netherlands. It develops, manufactures and markets RTP, which is a flexible high pressure pipe. It is supplied in long length coils of up to 400m length and has design pressure ratings from 36 to 450 bar. This type of pipe is typically used in the oil and gas industry for oil and gas flowlines, high pressure water injection and water transportation lines. However, they are also used for applications outside of the oil and gas industry including domestic gas, mining, CO_{2} and hydrogen applications.

This pipe has faster installation time compared to conventional steel pipes, as speeds of up to 2000m per day have been reached installing RTP in ground surface (with average speeds being approx. 1000m per day for normal RTP installations).
The pipe mainly benefits applications where steel fails due to corrosion and installation time is an issue.

== History ==
RTP was developed in the early 1990s by Wavin Repox, Akzo Nobel and by Tubes d'Aquitaine from France. They developed the first pipes reinforced with synthetic fibre to replace medium pressure steel pipes in response to growing demand for non-corrosive conduits for application in the onshore oil and gas industry, particularly from Shell in the Middle East. Because of its expertise in producing pipes, Pipelife Netherlands was involved in the project to develop long length RTP in 1998. The resulting system is marketed today under the name SoluForce.

SoluForce was the first ever RTP to be installed and used in the year 2000.

== Properties ==
The Soluforce RTP has a three layer pipe construction:

1. A HDPE liner pipe (different composition of material for low or high operating temperatures)
2. A reinforcement layer, typically Aramid (Twaron or Kevlar) or high strength steel wire
3. A white HDPE protective outer layer for UV, damage and abrasion protection

In some SoluForce pipe versions, an extra bonded aluminium layer is added to prevent light components and gasses from permeating.

SoluForce pipes are available in 4 and 6 inch versions. Depending on the reïnforcement layer, SoluForce pipes have design pressures of up to 450 bar / 6527 psi.

== Typical applications ==
Soluforce is used for the following applications:

- Oil and/or gas flowlines
- Oil field waste water disposal lines
- Oil field injection lines
- Offshore water injection risers
- Offshore oil flowlines
- High pressure Water injection lines
- High pressure gas transport lines
- Relining existing pipes

Although these kind of pipes have been developed for the oil and gas industry, they are also used for domestic gas, mining, CO_{2} and hydrogen applications.

== Testing and qualification ==
Soluforce RTP is tested and acknowledged by the following organisations:

- DNV Certification D-2615 - Soluforce System 4" and 5" with in-line couplings and end fittings
- ASTM - WK11803
- API - RP 15S (oil field service)
- ISO/TS 18226:2006 (gas service)
- DVGW VP 642 (German gas service)
- NYSEARCH project by the Northeast Gas Association (USA)

== See also ==
- Plastic Pressure Pipe Systems
- Pipeline transport
- Reinforced Thermoplastic Pipes
- Water injection (oil production)
- Wienerberger

== Bibliography ==
- Pipeline Report (1996). "Test confirm polyethylene pipe for high-pressure oil, gas service". Oil & Gas Journal (Sept, 9): 52–55.
- Helmut Lührsen (2001). "Reinforced Thermoplastic Pipes (RTP)". 3R International. 40: 48–49.
- Robert Eckert (2005). "Neuartige Verbindungstechnik für faserverstarkte Kunststofrohren in Hochdrukanwendungen". 3R International. 44: 266–268.
