= Chattahoochee Brick Company =

Brickworks in Atlanta, Georgia, United States

The Chattahoochee Brick Company was a brickworks located on the banks of the Chattahoochee River in Atlanta, Georgia, United States. The brickworks, founded by Atlanta mayor James W. English in 1878, is notable for its extensive use of convict lease labor, wherein hundreds of African American convicts worked in conditions similar to those experienced during antebellum slavery. It is speculated that some workers who died at the brickworks were buried on its grounds. The brickworks was discussed in Douglas A. Blackmon's Pulitzer Prize-winning book Slavery by Another Name, released in 2008. The property ceased to be an active brickworks in 2011.

== History ==
The brickworks company was founded in 1878 and located on the east bank of the Chattahoochee River in northwest Atlanta. From the company's founding, it employed convicts via the convict lease system. By 1886, James W. English would become the company's majority shareholder. Following this, English restructured another company he owned, Penitentiary Company No. 3, and was able to re-lease the convicts leased to that company to the Chattahoochee Brick Company. That same year, the Bureau of Labor issued a report that the brickmaking industry in Georgia, which had previously employed "about 600 hands", had been greatly impacted by convict leasing, with 30% of the state's brick production relying on convict leasing and many brickmakers saying they had to use the system to stay competitive with Chattahoochee Brick Company. By the 1890s, Chattahoochee Brick Company managed over 1,200 leased convicts, with about 150 working at the brickworks and the rest leased to other companies throughout the state. At the peak of the company's production, the site averaged about 175 workers per month, with an output of about 200,000 bricks per day. According to writer and journalist Douglas A. Blackmon, hundreds of millions of bricks produced at the brickworks are still in use in structures today.

In 1908, the government of Georgia outlawed the convict lease system, with the official end to the system occurring on March 31 of the next year. While company officials were initially concerned that the company would shut down due to the increased cost of labor, the plant continued producing bricks. However, the year after the convict lease system ended, the company reported a near-50% drop in annual brick production, with a significant increase in production costs as well. The Chattahoochee Brick Company would continue to operate at this site until 1978, (Note: A 2017 article in Bloomberg News states that the company went out of business in the 1970s, while an article in Atlanta published the same year claims that the site was closed in the 1980s. Records of the General Shale company state it was purchased in 1978.) when it closed and General Shale purchased the factory. In 2011, the site was razed.

In 2008, Blackmon released the book Slavery by Another Name, which discussed the convict lease system in the Southern United States and talked about the Chattahoochee Brick Company in this regard. The book was later adapted to a PBS documentary of the same name. Speaking of the site, Blackmon stated "This is not just a factory where people were treated badly. It’s a place where people were worked to death and buried in unmarked graves." Both Blackmon and others speculate that workers who died working at the brickworks were probably buried on the site. The site was described in a 2018 article in The Atlanta Journal-Constitution as "the Black Auschwitz of Georgia."

Following the brickworks closing in 2011, the nonprofit group The Trust for Public Land attempted to buy the land and convert it to a public park, but this did not come to fruition. In 2016, South Carolina-based Lincoln Energy Solutions attempted to buy the property and build a shipping facility, though this generated controversy among preservationists. In June that year, the company purchased 45 of the 75 acres of the site. Currently, the nonprofit group Groundwork Atlanta and a broad coalition of community organizations are seeking to build a public park and memorial on the property.

In 2021, Norfolk Southern began working on the property, with the intent to build a refueling station on the land. This generated outcry from preservationists and environmental activists, and in February of that year, they announced they were abandoning plans to build a rail terminal there. In August 2022, the City of Atlanta acquired the property and plans to develop it as a memorial, park, and greenspace with access to the Chattahoochee River.

== Sources ==
- Blackmon, Douglas A. (2012). Slavery by Another Name: The Re-Enslavement of Black Americans from the Civil War to World War II. Icon Books. ISBN 978-1-84831-413-9.
- Green, Josh (February 14, 2017). "Will the prisoners who labored to build Atlanta ever be acknowledged?". Atlanta. Archived from the original on March 25, 2023.
- Kahn, Michael (June 3, 2016). "Atlanta's Dark History Brings Up Development Quandry[sic]". Curbed Atlanta. Vox Media. Archived from the original on September 23, 2023.
- Kirk, Mimi (March 31, 2017). "Forced Laborers Built Atlanta's Streets. How Should the City Remember Them?". Bloomberg News. Bloomberg L.P. Archived from the original on June 8, 2022.
- LeFlouria, Talitha L. (2015). Chained in Silence: Black Women and Convict Labor in the New South. University of North Carolina Press. ISBN 978-1-4696-2248-4.
- Lichtenstein, Alex (1996). Twice the Work of Free Labor: The Political Economy of Convict Labor in the New South. Verso Books. ISBN 978-1-85984-086-3.
- McKay, Rich (July 20, 2018). "Post-slavery South chained to hard labor". The Atlanta Journal-Constitution. Cox Enterprises. Archived from the original on December 7, 2022.
- Samuel, Molly (June 1, 2016). "Debate Over Empty Lot Unearths Ugly Piece Of Atlanta History". WABE. Atlanta Public Schools. Archived from the original on March 21, 2023.
- Staples, Gracie Bonds (July 20, 2018). "Life with Gracie: 'This form of slavery was actually legal'". The Atlanta Journal-Constitution. Cox Enterprises. Archived from the original on March 26, 2023.
