= Redland plc =

UK company

- Industry: Building materials
- Founded: 1919
- Defunct: 1997
- Fate: Acquired
- Successor: Lafarge
- Headquarters: Reigate, UK
- Key people: Rudolph Agnew, (Chairman); Robert Napier, (CEO)
- Number of employees: >18,000

Redland plc was a leading British building materials business. It was listed on the London Stock Exchange and was once a constituent of the FTSE 100 Index.

== History ==
The company can trace its origins back to the Redhill Tile Company, which was a manufacturer of concrete tiles that was established in 1919.

During 1946, the company changed its name to Redland Tiles. In 1954, the firm expanded into Germany via its acquisition of a minority interest in Braas, a building materials business based in Heusenstamm. One year later, Redland Tiles was listed for the first time on the London Stock Exchange. During 1959, the company purchased the Bursledon Brickworks site located in the Hampshire village of Swanwick, near Southampton. Redland held control of this brickworks until 1974, at which point it ceased to exist. In 1969, the firm started operating in Australia, acquiring a significant shareholding in Monier Ltd.

Another product line of Redland's was plasterboard; prior to 1990, its activities in this sector were operated through a 51 per cent stake in a joint venture with the Australian industrial group CSR Limited. The joint venture comprised Redland Plasterboard UK, Redland Plasterboard Ireland, Escogypse and Salsi in France, and Orebro paper in Sweden. Redland Plasterboard operated four plasterboard plants, these based Bristol (United Kingdom), Delfzijl (the Netherlands), Drammen (Norway) and Anzin (France); they had a combined capacity of approximately 90 million square metres.

During July 1990, Redland announced the formation of a new and larger joint venture with the French industrial group Lafarge in which the firm held a minority share of 20 per cent in the venture. At the time of its creation, the new joint venture was the second largest supplier of plasterboard in Western Europe. The Redland brand was used as a trade name for the joint venture within the UK market. Furthermore, both Redland and Lafarge agreed to pursue the construction of a second UK-based production site to meet demand; the Bristol plant was also expanded shortly thereafter.

The firm completed several acquisitions during the early 1990s, which was partially financed via a £280 million rights issue completed in 1991. In May 1990, its US-based subsidiary acquired the concrete roof tile manufacturer Duratile; four months later, Braas acquired the prefabricated chimney system producer Schiedel for £30 million. By 1991, Braas was reportedly contributing almost half the profits of the Redland Group. That same year, Redland purchased Marley's US-based roof tile subsidiary for £6.6 million. During early 1992, the company acquired one of its major British-based competitors, Steetley plc, for £1 billion; however, this acquisition would prove to be particularly costly in the long run. Less than a year after the deal's completion, Redland started selling off portions of the former Steetley business.

While the firm was still reporting positive results throughout 1994, exceeding market expectations, the company was compelled to reduce its dividend by one-third and openly acknowledge the need to address its financial performance by April 1995. Less than a year later, Redland commenced restructuring and discussion options for the sale of its brick making division.

During mid 1996, Redland sold its brick business to the British building materials firm Ibstock in exchange for £160 million. By early 1997, speculation of the company's potential breakup was rampant, although this prospect was denied by senior management. During October of that year, it was announced that Redland had been acquired by Lafarge for £1.8 billion.

During 2008, the roofing division was divested by Lafarge. The company, which initially was named Monier Ltd led to the return of the Redland Brand in the UK; the company was subsequently rebranded as Monier Redland Limited (part of the Monier Group of companies) and is based in Crawley in West Sussex. From 2017, the business has been called BMI Redland.
