= General Shale =

Manufacturer of bricks and masonry

General Shale, Inc.
- Type: Subsidiary
- Industry: Building material
- Founded: 1928
- Headquarters: Johnson City, Tennessee
- Key people: Charles Smith (CEO)
- Products: Bricks, masonry, pavers, concrete block
- Parent: wienerberger
- Website: www.generalshale.com

General Shale Brick, Inc. is an American manufacturer of clay bricks, stone products, masonry solutions, PVC pipes, and architectural building products. General Shale is the North American subsidiary of the Austrian company wienerberger.

== History ==
=== Early history ===
The company was formed by a merger of the Kingsport Brick Corporation and Johnson City Shale Brick Corporation on September 1, 1928. Sam R. Sells was the first president of the combined company.

The Kingsport company was founded in 1910, but by the late 1920s, it struggled with decaying facilities and inefficient production. The Johnson City company was formed in 1920 and had lower-quality clay than Kingsport, but a larger workforce. In the years following the merger, General Shale acquired the Oliver Springs Brick Company, the Richland Brick Corporation, the Bristol Brick Corporation, the Jellico Brick and Coal Company, and the Knoxville Brick Company.

The company faced financial difficulties during the Great Depression, and the Johnson City factory was temporarily foreclosed. Contracts with the acquired companies were redrawn, and General Shale had to take out a loan from the Reconstruction Finance Corporation to remain operational.

In 1945, General Shale constructed a factory for making concrete blocks, and that business grew to be very profitable over the following decade.

The company began to expand again in the 1950s, starting with the construction of a tunnel kiln at the factory in Knoxville, Tennessee in 1951. That was followed by the purchase of the Key-James Brick Company, Elizabethton Cinder Block Company, and the Appalachian Shale Products Company in 1952. The Coral Ridge Brick and Tile Company were purchased that year as well. More tunnel kilns were constructed at the company's factories in the years that followed.

=== Public company ===
General Shale went public in 1960 after one of the charter members decided to sell their shares. The company purchased the Southside Brick Works of Richmond, Virginia in 1963, the Huntsville Brick and Tile Company in 1966, and the Standard Brick & Tile Corporation of Evansville, Indiana in 1967.

The following years brought more acquisitions; the California Clay Products Company, McMinnville Concrete Products Company, Cumberland Mountain Sand Company, Smithville Concrete Company, and Sparta Concrete Company were purchased in 1969. General Shale abandoned the California operation in 1970 after significant losses.

The company gained control of the Locher Brick Company and Maples Block Company in 1972. The next year, General Shale purchased two lightweight aggregate plants in Arkansas.

The following energy crisis led to difficulty in sourcing fuels for kilns and drove many of the company's plants to switch from gas to coal. General Shale closed and downsized many factories during the late 1970s, before reaching what were then record-high sales in 1978. In that year, the Chattahoochee Brick Company was purchased.

The early 1980s recession significantly hampered General Shale's growth, but the company remained profitable by selling off some real estate and minimizing expenses. By the mid-1980s, the company had regained much of its business.

=== Wienerberger ===
In 1999, General Shale was acquired by wienerberger, the world's largest brick manufacturer. The company continued to grow under new ownership. Arriscraft, a manufacturer of cast stone products, was acquired in 2007. Pipelife Jet Stream, a manufacturer of PVC pipe, was purchased in 2016, and Columbus Brick was bought in 2017. The 2021 purchase of Meridian Brick of Georgia doubled revenues in the United States.

Wienerberger finalized its purchase of French tile manufacturer Terreal in 2024, giving General Shale control of Terreal's North American subsidiary Ludowici Roof Tile. Around the same time General Shale completed a purchase of Summitville Tile, an Ohio floor tile and facing brick manufacturer.
