= Baggeridge Brick =

British brick manufacturer

- Industry: Building materials
- Founded: 1944
- Defunct: 2007
- Fate: Acquired
- Successor: Wienerberger
- Headquarters: Manchester, UK

Baggeridge Brick was a British manufacturer of bricks, and was the UK's fourth-largest manufacturer of bricks during the 2000s. It became a subsidiary of the world's biggest brick manufacturer, Wienerberger AG, in late 2007.

== History ==
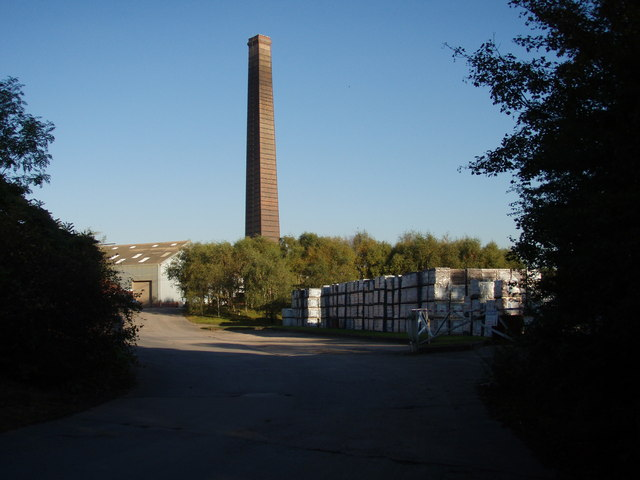
Former brick works in October 2007

The Baggeridge Brick Company was founded near Baggeridge Country Park in Staffordshire. It was incorporated on 7 April 1944. It first began making bricks in Worcestershire. It was headquartered in Gospel End in South Staffordshire.

During 1996, a temporary production stoppage was enacted due to a short term collapse in brick demand across the UK's construction sector, which negatively impacted fiscal results for that year. In September 1998, Baggeridge purchased rival manufacturer Rudgwick Brick in exchange for £2.25 million.

During 2001, the company launched several new product ranges, including a new fast cladding option. By 2002, Baggeridge was the final independent brick producer in Britain.

In February 2004, Baggeridge announced that a planned refit of its factory would lead to increased profitability. During 2005, Baggeridge's profits were negatively impacted by a wider slowdown in Britain's housing market as well as increased production costs, the latter being attributed to higher energy prices.

In August 2006, Baggeridge received an offer from the Austrian company Wienerberger AG, the world's largest producer of bricks, to purchase it in exchange for £89.2 million. At the time of the transaction, Baggeridge held a 9 percent share of the British market, making it the fourth largest brick manufacturer in the country; around this time, the wider sector was also undergoing consolidation. In June 2007, in response to Michelmersh, another brick manufacturer, publicly declaring its interest in launching its own bid for Baggeridge, Wienerberger purchased a majority of the firm's shares and increased its offer to 247p per share. In late 2007, the acquisition was completed after the UK's Office of Fair Trading referred the matter to the Competition Commission. By January 2008, it had been fully integrated with Wienerberger's other UK operations, which made it the third largest brick manufacturer in the UK.

== Structure ==
The resulting company is presently headquartered in south Manchester.
