= Steetley plc =

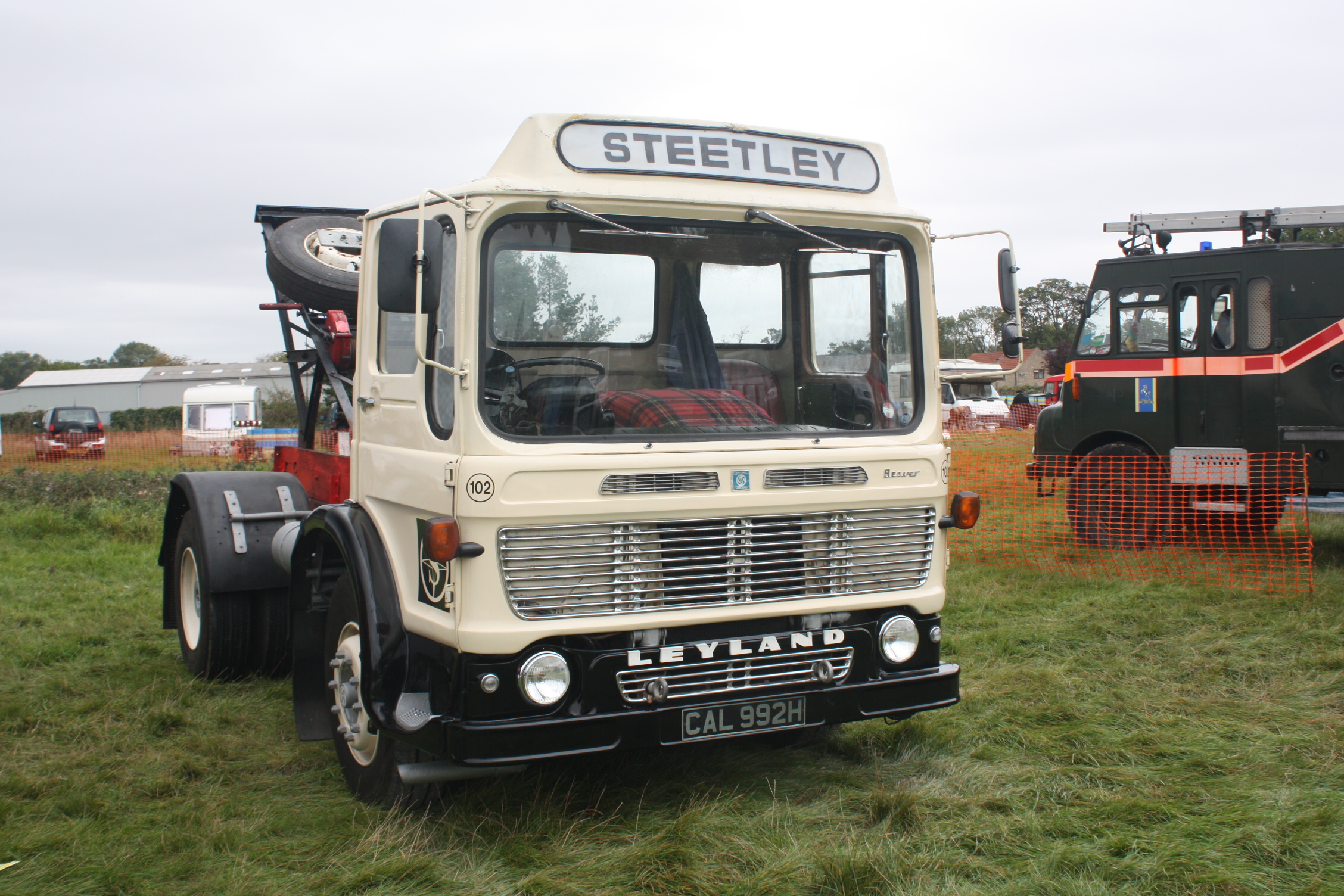
- A Leyland Truck formerly operated by Steetley plc
- Industry: Building materials
- Founded: 1885
- Defunct: 1992
- Fate: Acquired
- Successor: Redland plc
- Headquarters: Rugby, Warwickshire, UK
- Key people: David Donne (Chairman)

Steetley plc was a large building materials business based in Rugby, Warwickshire, England.

== History ==
The business was founded by Isaac Sharples as The Steetley Lime and Building Stone Company at Steetley near Worksop in Nottinghamshire in January 1885.

It initially mined dolomite deposits for use in blast furnaces for steelmaking. However, it grew organically and by acquisition to become a large broadly-based building materials business.

In 1952, the company acquired the Canada Crushed and Cut Stone Company, which mined dolomite deposits near Niagara Falls in Canada.

A takeover bid by Hepworth Ceramic Holdings was blocked by the Monopolies and Mergers Commission in 1984.

The company moved its headquarters from Gateford Hill in Worksop in Nottinghamshire to Brownsover Road in Rugby, Warwickshire in 1986.

In early 1992, after a hostile takeover battle, the company was acquired by one of its major British-based competitors, Redland plc for £1 billion.
