= Wienerberger =

Manufacturer of bricks, pavers and pipes

Wienerberger AG
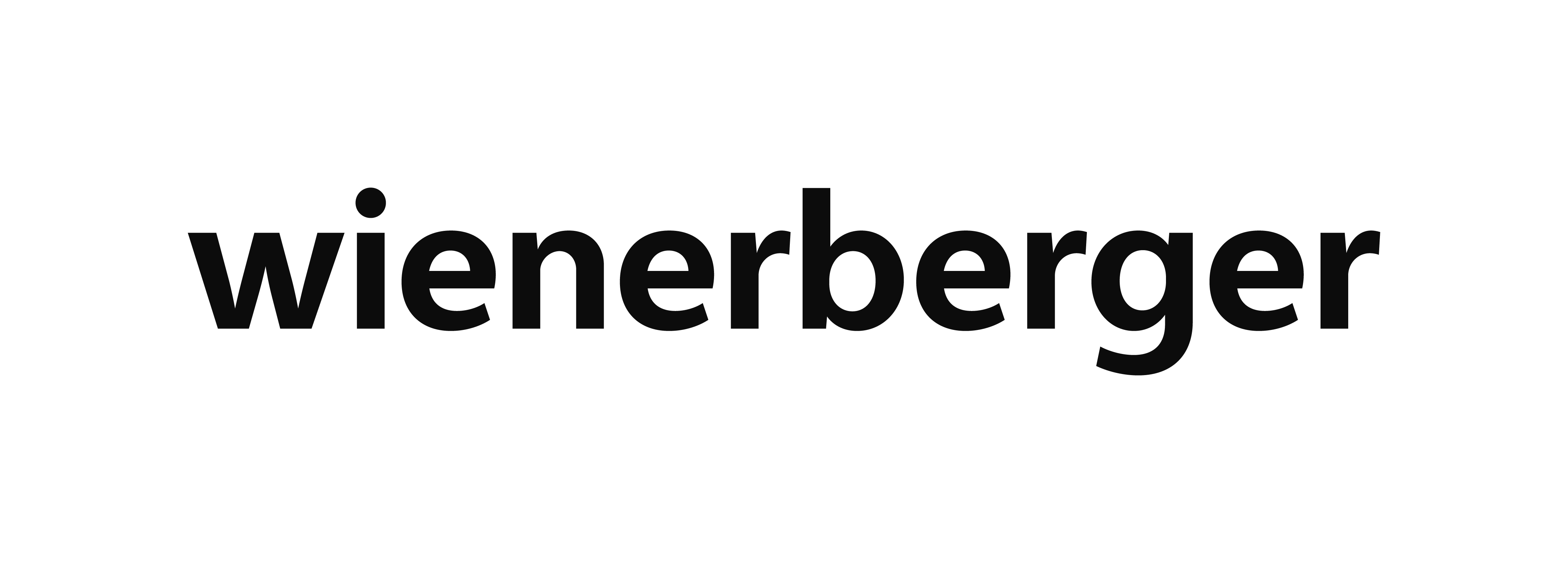

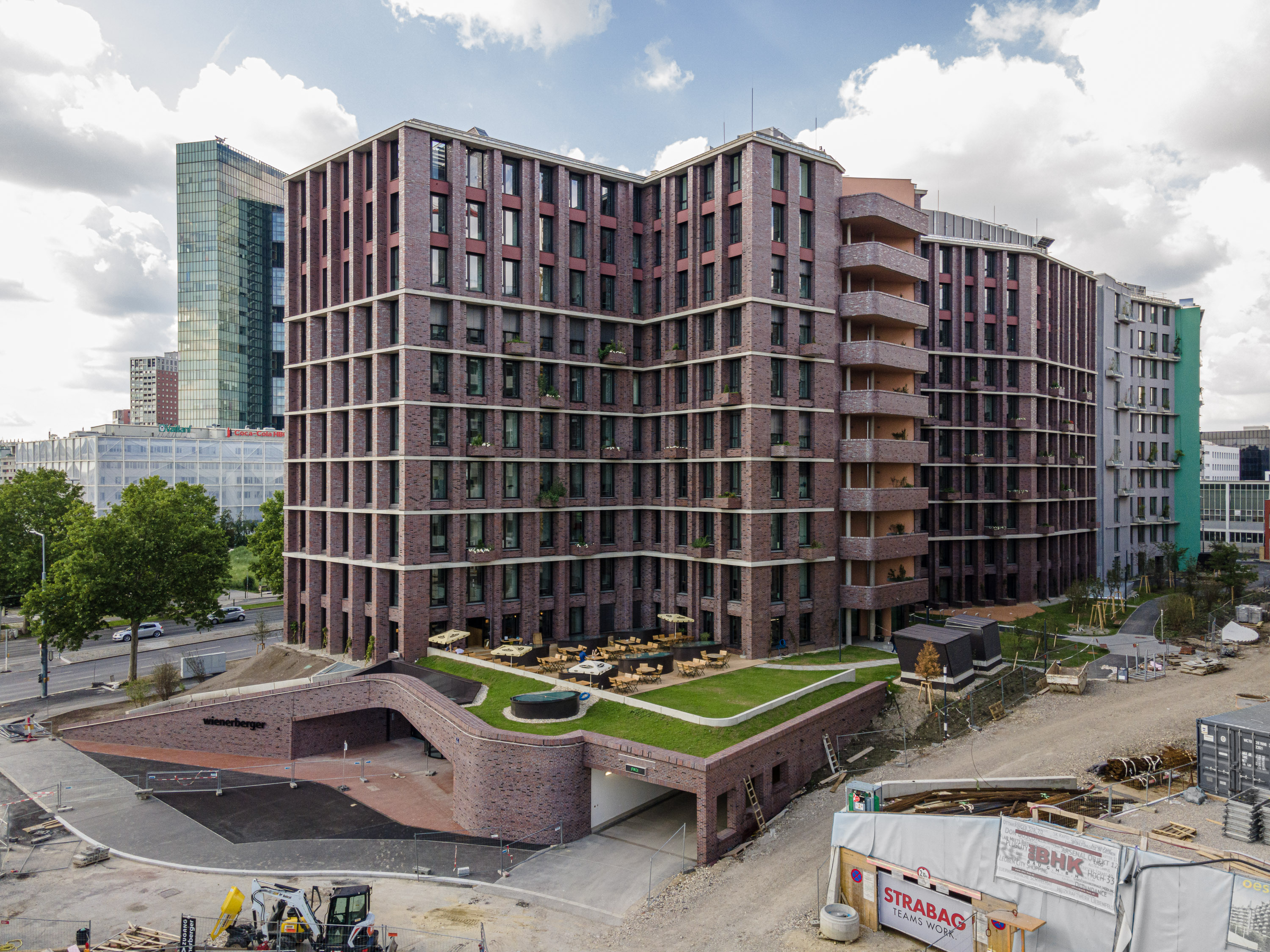
- Wienerberger AG Headquarter
- Type: Aktiengesellschaft
- Traded as: WBAG: WIE
- Industry: Building materials
- Founded: 1819
- Headquarters: Vienna, Austria
- Key people: Gerhard Hanke (CEO); Dagmar Steinert (CFO); Harald Schwarzmayr (COO West)
- Products: bricks, tiles, concrete pavers and pipe systems
- Revenue: €4,566 million (2025)
- Operating income: €332 million (2025)
- Net income: €166 million (2025)
- Total assets: €6,142 million (2025)
- Total equity: €2,802 million (2025)
- Number of employees: >20.000 (2025)
- Website: www.wienerberger.com

Wienerberger AG (stylised as wienerberger) is an Austrian building solutions and infrastructure systems company which is Europe's leading manufacturer of roof tiles and the world’s largest producer of bricks.

In addition to clay products, the company is one of the leading suppliers of plastic pipe in Europe. With its over 200 production sites, the Wienerberger Group generated revenues of €4,566 million and operating EBITDA of €754 million in 2025. It is based in Vienna, Austria. Founded in 1819, the company's shares have been listed on the Vienna Stock Exchange since 1869 and currently have a free float of 100%.

== History ==
In 1819, Wienerberger was founded in Vienna by Alois Miesbach and got its start making use of clay deposits in the Wienerberg area of Vienna. The company embraced innovations such as circular kiln designs, allowing it to have near-continuous production and achieve early success. Miesbach continued to increase manufacturing capacity as the business grew, and by the time of his death in 1857 the company had nine factories, a clay plant, and multiple coal mines. Miesbach's nephew, Heinrich Drasche, took over the company and maintained its dominant position. Starting in 1869, the company traded on the Vienna Stock Exchange.

For the next hundred years, Wienerberger was the market leader in Austria. They branched into other related industries, such as ornamental sculptures, roof tiles, and architectural terracotta. After World War One and the fall of the Austro-Hungarian Empire Wienerberger lost many of its foreign operations and rebuilt around its core Austrian businesses.

The company began using mechanical presses for brick production around the 1920s, allowing them to produce perforated bricks. Advanced tunnel kilns were adopted during the 1950s, which led to increased manufacturing efficiency. The firm purchased Bramac, a concrete roof tile manufacturer, in 1973.

Starting with its purchase of Germany's Oltmanns-Gruppe company in 1987, Wienerberger expanded into other regions of Europe and entered the plastic pipe business.

In December 1998, Wienerberger acquired a 30 percent stake in the UK-based brick manufacturer Ibstock plc, leading to speculation that it may subsequently purchase the whole company. In 1999, the company acquired the United States-based company General Shale in exchange for $260 million; this transaction brought Wienerberger into the US market for the first time, as well as making it the world's leading manufacturer of bricks.

In April 2000, the Dublin-based building materials supplier CRH plc was reportedly mulling making a bid to acquire Wienerberger. In 2001, the UK-based firm Hanson Plc sold its brick interests on continental Europe to the company for £39.3 million. In October 2004, Wienerberger acquired the UK-based supplier Thebrickbusiness in exchange for £90 million, increasing the company's market share in Britain.

During 2007, Wienerberger competed with the British brick producer Michelmersh Brick Holdings over the ownership of another British-based brick company Baggeridge Brick; Wienerberger ultimately came out on top after increasing its offer to 247p per share and purchasing the majority of the shares in the firm.

In 2009, in response to the outbreak of the Great Recession, the company issued a profit warning, shuttered multiple of its plants and permanently closed two others, resulting in the loss of 80 jobs. During the following year, Wienerberger opted to extend its existing loans and enacted a 15 percent price increase across its product range.

The company continued to undertake numerous international acquisitions, including of Semmelrock in 2010, and Tondach Gleinstätten and Keymer Tiles in 2014. In 2021, the company's American subsidiary, General Shale, acquired Meridian Brick of Georgia, doubling revenues in the United States. Customer demand recovered during the early 2010s, to the extent that Wienerberger was forced to temporarily close their order books, along with expanded production by 400 million bricks, in 2014.

In 2021, Wienerberger subsidiary firm General Shale purchased Meridian Brick from Boral Ltd in exchange for $250 million.

In 2024, Wienerberger finalized its purchase of French tile manufacturer Terreal; this transaction considerably expanded its presence throughout Europe as well as giving it ownership of both Creaton and Ludowici Roof Tile. Around the same time, subsidiary firm General Shale completed its purchase of Summitville Tile, an Ohio floor tile and facing brick manufacturer. In February 2026, Wienerberger obtained a 50 per cent stake in Gruppo Italcer in exchange for €350 million. In June of that year, it also purchased Univerzum Group, the largest clay block producer in Serbia.

In November 2025, Wienerberger opened a new fully-electric concrete tile factory in Sittingbourne, UK. In May 2026, the company launched construction of the world's first fully-electric roof tile kiln at Broomfleet in the UK.

== Architecture Award - Brick Award ==
In 2004, Wienerberger launched the Brick Award, an architecture prize that is presented every two years. Its goal is to recognize outstanding and innovative brick architecture. Projects are evaluated based on their sustainability, climate resilience, energy efficiency, functionality and architectural quality. The competition features five categories, honoring projects that showcase the versatility of ceramic building materials in unique ways. The use of Wienerberger products is not a prerequisite for participation. Winners are honored at an award ceremony and published in the Brick Book. The award is endowed with prize money of 7,000 Euro for the grand prize winner (incl. category winner) and 5,000 Euro for each of the remaining four category winners.
