= Douglas A. Blackmon =

American writer and journalist (born 1964)

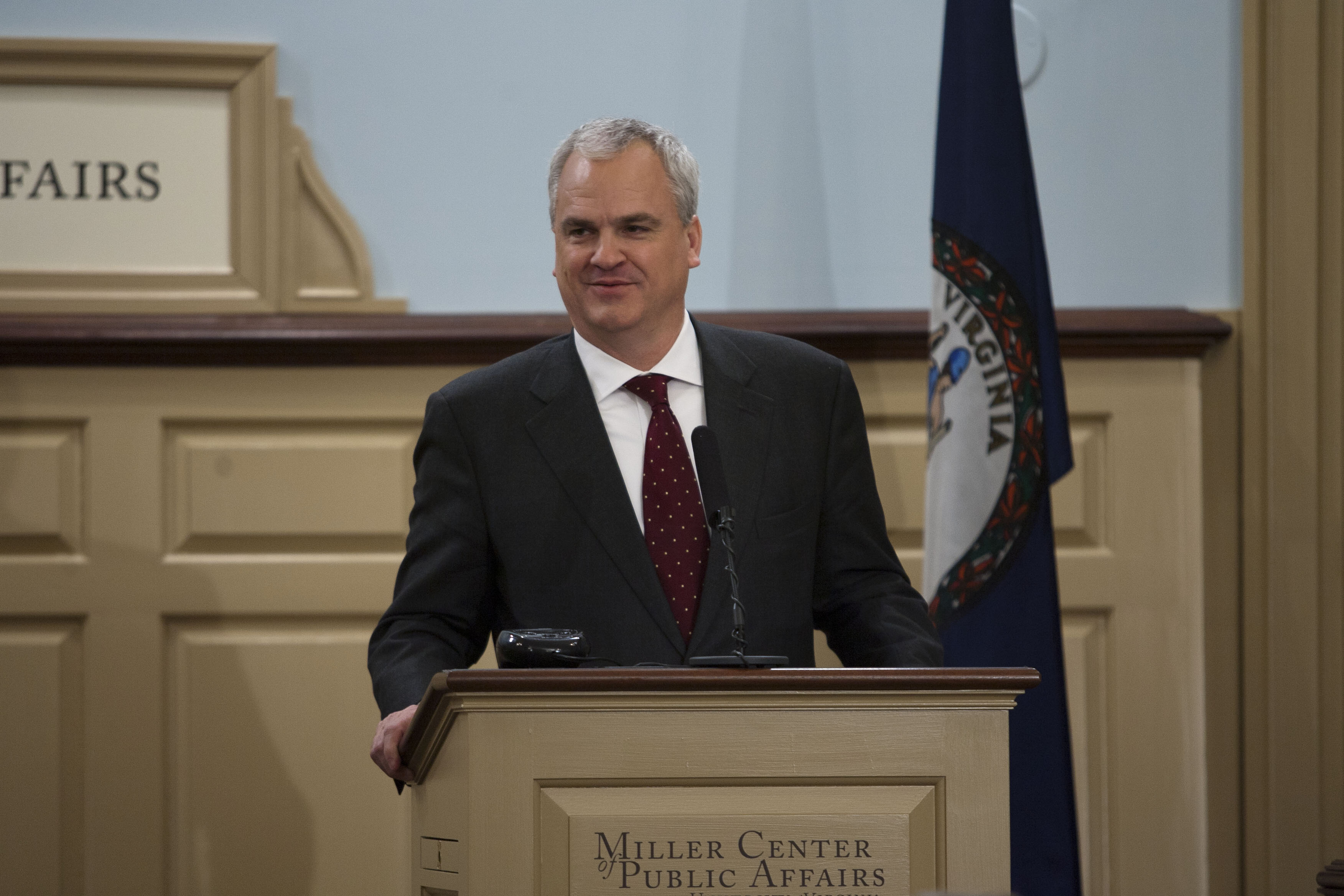
- Blackmon at the Miller Center in Charlottesville, Virginia, on January 16, 2012
- Born: 1964 (age 61–62); Stuttgart, Arkansas, U.S.
- Occupation: Journalist
- Writing career
- Notable work: Slavery by Another Name: The Re-Enslavement of Black Americans from the Civil War to World War II

Douglas A. Blackmon (born 1964) is an American writer and journalist who won a Pulitzer Prize in 2009 for his book, Slavery by Another Name: The Re-Enslavement of Black Americans from the Civil War to World War II.

== Early life and education ==
Blackmon was born in Stuttgart, Arkansas, and grew up in Leland, Mississippi, in the Mississippi Delta. He has said that the small town of 6,000 was evenly split between black and white people; the county and area, one of plantations, was majority-black. It was the site of a plantation strike among black laborers, leading to extensive civil rights activity in the mid-twentieth century. He graduated from Hendrix College.

== Career ==
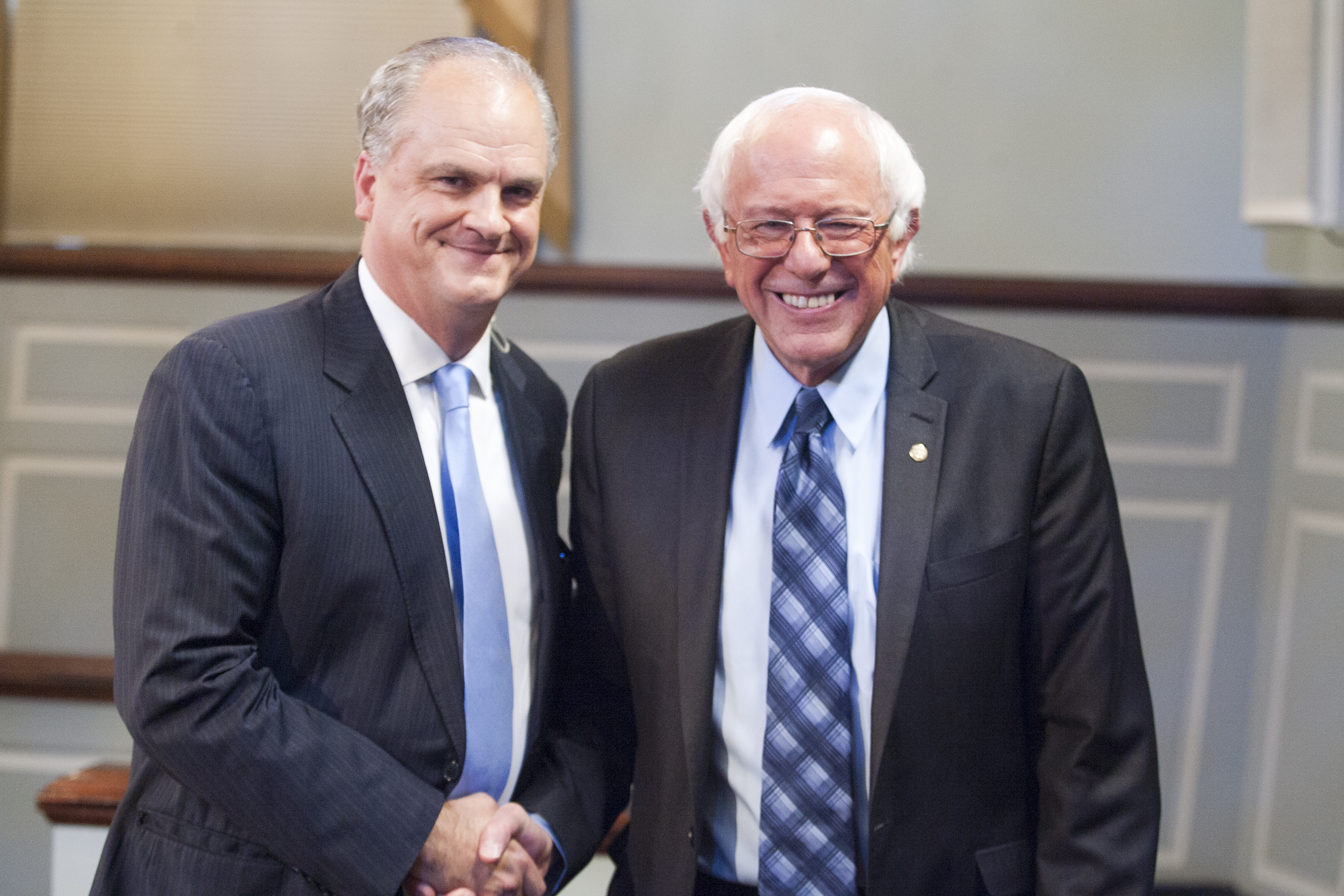
Blackmon with Bernie Sanders in 2015

Blackmon first worked as a reporter for the Arkansas Democrat and he later as the managing editor of the Daily Record, both in Little Rock. He later moved to Atlanta, where he worked as a reporter at The Atlanta Journal-Constitution. In 1995, he began working for The Wall Street Journal and in 2012 became its Atlanta bureau chief. While there, he shared the 2011 Gerald Loeb Award for Large Newspapers for the story "Deep Trouble".

=== Slavery by Another Name ===
In 2008, Blackmon published Slavery by Another Name: The Re-Enslavement of Black Americans from the Civil War to World War II, which explores the history of peonage and convict lease labor in the South after the American Civil War. He reveals the stories of tens of thousands of enslaved people and their descendants who journeyed into freedom after Abraham Lincoln issued the Emancipation Proclamation and then back into involuntary servitude, which lasted into the 20th century. In 2009, Blackmon was awarded the Pulitzer Prize for General Nonfiction for Slavery by Another Name.

A documentary film based on Blackmon's book, also titled Slavery by Another Name, aired February 13, 2012 on PBS stations.

=== American Forum ===
From 2012 until 2018 Blackmon was the host and executive producer of American Forum, a weekly public-affairs program that was broadcast on more than 250 PBS stations in the United States. It was produced in conjunction with the University of Virginia's Miller Center of Public Affairs, where Blackmon was a senior fellow and the Director of Public Programs.

=== Teaching ===
Since 2018, Blackmon has taught at Georgia State University in Atlanta, and leads a major research project in conjunction with the National Center for Civil and Human Rights to identify thousands of forced laborers compelled into involuntary servitude by the criminal justice system under horrific conditions at early 20th-century work camps, such as the Chattahoochee Brick Company in Atlanta.

=== Activism ===
In 2023, Blackmon accepted an appointment to a mayoral task force examining issues surrounding a proposed police and emergency personnel training center, commonly known as Cop City especially by critics. The 38 members of the group included both supporters and opponents of the training center, as well as members who said they had not yet taken a position on the controversy.

Blackmon served on a committee focused on memorialization of past victims of mass incarceration at the site, and recommended preservation of ruins of an earlier city jail as an educational installation portraying the history of racial abuse by Atlanta police, memorializing citizens who were unjustly victimized, and honoring the history of protest in Atlanta against police abuse—including demonstrations by Black Lives Matter and opponents of the Cop City training facility. In the final presentation of the task force findings, Blackmon called the report a call for a "the most sweeping reexamination ever of policing in Atlanta."

=== The Harvest ===
In the fall of 2023, Blackmon and his creative partner, filmmaker Sam Pollard, completed The Harvest, a personal two-hour documentary examining the consequences of the failed public school integration in Blackmon's Mississippi hometown. Written and narrated by Blackmon, and co-produced with Pollard, the film was first broadcast on PBS on September 12, 2023. The Harvest was announced in July 2023 as one of six finalist for the Library of Congress Lavine/Ken Burns Prize For Film, one of the highest honors for documentary film.
