= Keymer Tiles =

- Industry: Construction
- Founded: 1588
- Headquarters: Burgess Hill, UK
- Number of employees: 47 (2013)
- Website: www.keymer.co.uk

Keymer Tiles is a traditional producer of clay roof tiles founded in 1588 and located in Burgess Hill, United Kingdom.

It is a subsidiary of the Austrian company Wienerberger. The company is known for its traditional red terracotta roof tiles.

In 2013, the company supplied peg tiles for refurbishment works at Leeds Castle.

In 2023, a Surrey home topped with Keymer tiles was short-listed by RIBA (The Royal Institute of British Architects) for their annual House of the Year Award.

== See also ==
- List of oldest companies
