= Swanwick Lakes =

Nature reserve in Hampshire, England

Coordinates: 50.886°N 1.281°W

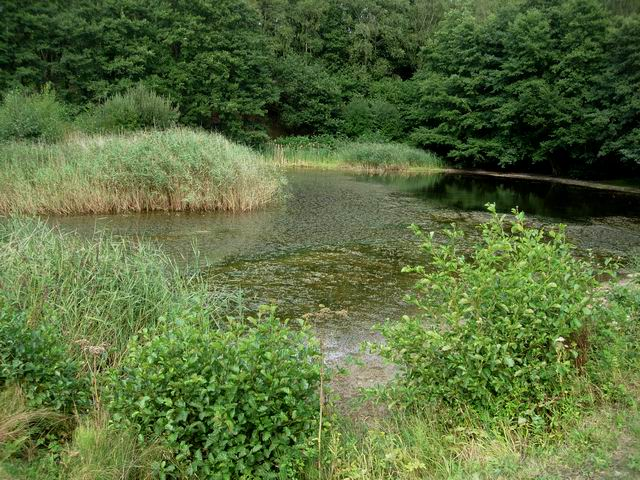
- Interactive map of Swanwick Lakes
- Type: Nature reserve
- Location: Swanwick, Hampshire
- OS grid: SU 507 099
- Area: 35 hectares (86 acres)
- Manager: Hampshire and Isle of Wight Wildlife Trust

Swanwick Lakes is a 35-hectare (86-acre) nature reserve in Swanwick in Hampshire. It is managed by the Hampshire and Isle of Wight Wildlife Trust.

Most of this site is woodland, and there are also meadows and lakes in former clay pits. The north-east meadow has many orchids and butterflies. There is also an educational facility for children to learn about the environment.
