= Michelmersh Brick Holdings =

British brick manufacturer

- Industry: Building materials
- Founded: 3 November 1997
- Fate: Trading
- Headquarters: UK

Michelmersh Brick Holdings plc is a manufacturer of bricks. It is listed on the London Stock Exchange.

== History ==
Michelmersh was incorporated in November 1997. In March 2000, the company acquired both Blockleys Bricks and New Acres in a single transaction for £11.75 million.

In May 2004, Michelmersh was floated on the Alternative Investment Market of the London Stock Exchange; this move, which valued the company at £21.3 million, funded a series of modernisation works across its four manufacturing sites that reportedly cost £13 million. As a result of this modernisation effort, by 2006, it was the fourth biggest brick manufacturer in Britain.

During 2007, Michelmersh competed with Austrian brick manufacturer Wienerberger AG over the ownership of Baggeridge Brick, which was concluded when Wienerberger increased its offer to 247p per share and bought the majority of the shares in the firm.

In April 2009, following the start of the Great Recession, Michelmersh recorded a loss of £2.9 million. In 2010, the company stated its intention to pursue expansion by completing acquisitions while disposing of surplus assets such as unneeded land; that same year, it bought Freshfield Lane Brickworks for £10 million. In September 2011, the firm reported that it had returned to profitability amid the recovery of the wider construction market.

In late 2013, the company observed that sales had increased by 10 percent. In response, it raised £10 million via the issuing of shares; this measure financed manufacturing improvements that expanded production by six million units per year. In 2017, Michelmersh purchased the South Yorkshire-based firm Carlton for £31.2 million; this acquisition increased the company's annual brick production rate beyond 100 million.

In response to the COVID-19 pandemic in the United Kingdom, a three-week production stoppage was enacted on 30 March 2020; a period of weak demand across the construction sector for months following the resumption. By November of that year, the company declared that trading had returned to nominal levels; in March 2022, it was reported that Michelmersh's performance had surpassed its pre-pandemic peak. That same year, in response to escalating energy prices, the firm had accelerated its alternative energy programme, rolling out solar panels across its factories. During the early 2020s, Michelmersh produced the world's first hydrogen-fired brick.

In November 2022, Michelmersh purchased the prefabricated specialist FabSpeed in exchange for roughly £6.25 million. In March 2023, the firm recorded a profit of £11.4 million while maintaining a margin of 40 per cent. In March 2025, it reported a pre-tax profit of £8 million, attributing this result to intense competition. In March 2026, the company launched a programme of works to improve its production locations. Two months later, in response to a nationwide construction slowdown, Michelmersh elected to discontinue production at its Charnwood site.
