= Slavery by Another Name =

2008 book by Douglas A. Blackmon

- Author: Douglas A. Blackmon
- Subject: African-American history, disfranchisement after Reconstruction era
- Genre: Nonfiction
- Publisher: Anchor Books
- Publication date: 2008
- Pages: 468 pp.
- ISBN: 978-0-385-50625-0

Slavery by Another Name: The Re-Enslavement of Black Americans from the Civil War to World War II is a book by American writer Douglas A. Blackmon, published by Anchor Books in 2008. It explores the forced labor of prisoners, overwhelmingly African American men, through the convict lease system used by states, local governments, white farmers, and corporations after the American Civil War until World War II in the southern United States. Blackmon argues that slavery in the United States did not end with the Civil War, but instead persisted well into the 20th century. It depicts the subjugation of convict leasing, sharecropping and peonage and tells the fate of the former but not of the latter two.

Slavery by Another Name began as an article which Blackmon wrote for The Wall Street Journal detailing the use of black forced labor by U.S. Steel Corporation. Seeing the popular response to the article, he began conducting research for a more comprehensive exploration of the topic. The resulting book was well received by critics and became a New York Times Best Seller. In 2009, it was awarded the Pulitzer Prize for General Nonfiction. In 2012, it was adapted into a documentary film of the same name for PBS.

== Background ==
Douglas Blackmon is a Wall Street Journal reporter. He grew up in Washington County, Mississippi, where as a seventh grader he was encouraged by his teacher and his mother to research a local racist incident, despite the opposition of some citizens. The experience began a lifelong interest in the history of American race relations.

In 2003, Blackmon wrote a story on the use of black convict labor in the coal mines of U.S. Steel. The story generated a large response, and was later anthologized in Best Business Stories. Blackmon began to research the subject more widely, visiting various southern county courthouses to obtain records of arrest, conviction, and sentences.

He later stated:

[A]s I began to research, even I, as someone who had been paying attention to some of these sorts of things for a long time and was open to alternative explanations, even I was fairly astonished when I put it together, basically by going county by county and finding the criminal arrest records and the jail records in county after county after county from this period of time and seeing that if there had been crime waves, there had to have been records of crimes and people being arrested for crimes. And in reality, it's just not there.

There's no evidence that that ever happened. In fact, it's the opposite. The crime waves that occurred by and large were the aftermath of the war and whites coming back from fighting in the Civil War and settling scores with people and all sorts of renegade activity that didn't involve black people at all, but they were blamed for it, and that was then used as a kind of ruse for why these incredibly brutal new legal measures then began to be put in place.

The resulting book, Slavery by Another Name, was published by Anchor Books in 2008.

== Contents ==
In the introduction to Slavery by Another Name, Blackmon describes his experience as a reporter for the Wall Street Journal "asking a provocative question: What would be revealed if American corporations were examined through the same sharp lens of historical confrontation as the one then being trained on German corporations that relied on Jewish slave labor during World War II and the Swiss banks that robbed victims of the Holocaust of their fortunes?". His story describing corporate use of black forced labor in the post-Civil War South generated more response than any other piece he had written, and inspired him to pursue a book-length study of the subject (see Reconstruction Era).

Blackmon structures his narrative around a young African-American man named Green Cottenham; though the records of Cottenham's life are incomplete, Blackmon says that "the absence of his voice rests at the center of this book." Cottenham, who was born in the 1880s to two former slaves, was arrested in 1908 for vagrancy, a common pretext to detain blacks who did not have a white patron. The state of Alabama rented Cottenham as a laborer to a coal mine owned by U.S. Steel Corporation, where he died.

As context, Blackmon describes the beginnings of "industrial slavery", in which convict laborers were put to work in factories or mines rather than cotton fields. Though slaves were formally emancipated by the Thirteenth Amendment to the United States Constitution following the Civil War, after Reconstruction, white-dominated Southern state legislatures passed Black Codes, "an array of interlocking laws essentially intended to criminalize black life", to restrict the economic independence of blacks and provide pretexts for jail terms. Blacks were often unable to pay even small fees and were sentenced to labor as a result; convicts were leased to plantations, lumber camps, and mines to be used for forced labor. Joseph E. Brown, former governor of Georgia, amassed great wealth based on his use of convict labor in his Dade Coal Company mines and other enterprises, from 1874 to 1894.

In the early 20th century, federal prosecutors such as Eugene Reese attempted to prosecute responsible parties under federal laws against debt bondage. But such efforts received little support nationally and none in the South, which had disenfranchised most blacks to exclude them from the political system. Northern attention was focused on immigration and World War I. The convict lease system finally ended with the advent of World War II. National and presidential attention was focused on racial issues because of the need for national unity and mobilization of the military.

In the book's epilogue, Blackmon argues for the importance of acknowledging this history of forced labor:

[T]he evidence moldering in county courthouses and the National Archives compels us to confront this extinguished past, to recognize the terrible contours of the record, to teach our children the truth of a terror that pervaded much of American life, to celebrate its end, to lift any shame on those who could not evade it. This book is not a call for financial reparations. Instead, I hope it is a formidable plea for a resurrection and fundamental reinterpretation of a tortured chapter in the collective American past.

== Reception ==
The book was a New York Times Best Seller and was praised by critics.

Janet Maslin of The New York Times wrote that it "eviscerates a basic assumption: that slavery in America ended with the Civil War." She praised the book's evidence as "relentless and fascinating," although she thought that the conceit of reconstructing Cottenham's life gives the book "a shaky start". Leonard Pitts, a columnist for the Miami Herald, wrote that "Slavery by Another Name is an astonishing book. It will challenge and change your understanding of what we were as Americans - and of what we are. I cannot recommend it to you highly enough."

W. Fitzhugh Brundage wrote in The Journal of Blacks in Higher Education that

Blackmon deserves high praise for this deeply moving and troubling history. He especially deserves praise for teasing out the largest implications of his research. He aptly, and carefully, draws parallels between the corporate responsibility of companies that exploited slave labor in Nazi Germany and that of southerners who bought convict labor.

In the Sunday Gazette-Mail, Chris Vognar called the book "chilling, doggedly reported and researched". A review in the Rocky Mountain News stated of the book, "Displaying meticulous research, and personalizing the larger story through individual experiences, Blackmon's book opens the eyes and wrenches the gut."

African American Studies scholar James Smethurst was more critical, writing in The Boston Globe that "this catalogue of the nadir is one of the book's weaknesses, since it sometimes departs from its account of peonage without much transition. Paying more attention to the considerable presence of involuntary servitude in African-American literature and intellectual history, reaching back to Charles Chesnutt and Paul Laurence Dunbar, would have helped". However, he concludes that "the book vividly and engagingly recalls the horror and sheer magnitude of such neo-slavery and reminds us how long after emancipation such practices persisted."

Slavery by Another Name was awarded the 2009 Pulitzer Prize for General Nonfiction. The award committee called it "a precise and eloquent work that examines a deliberate system of racial suppression and rescues a multitude of atrocities from virtual obscurity."

In 2011, Mark Melvin, an inmate at the Kilby Correctional Facility, was banned from reading the book by Alabama Department of Corrections officials. They described it as "an attempt to incite violence based on race, religion, sex, creed or nationality". Melvin filed a lawsuit stating that his First Amendment rights had been violated. Blackmon said of the officials' actions that "The idea that a book like mine is somehow incendiary or a call to violence is so absurd".

== Film adaptation ==
Slavery by Another Name was adapted as a 90-minute documentary film, which premiered on PBS in February 2012. The film was executive produced by Catherine Allan of Twin Cities Public Television, co-executive produced by Blackmon, directed by Sam Pollard, written by Sheila Curran Bernard, and narrated by Laurence Fishburne. It was funded in part by the National Endowment for the Humanities. Slavery by Another Name premiered in competition at the Sundance Film Festival in January 2012. The film is streaming free online, in English and with Haitian-Creole, Portuguese, and Spanish subtitles. A 20-minute classroom version with curriculum materials is also available.

Neil Genzliger of The New York Times wrote of the film that "by filling in an overlooked part of black history, this sobering film enhances our understanding of why race issues have proved so intractable."

Daniel Fienberg of Hitfix, viewing the film at Sundance, wrote

Slavery By Another Name is sturdy and well-researched stuff and it will play well when it airs on PBS next month and it should play well in the future in classrooms, but as a film festival entry, it isn't nearly confident enough in its artistry. There's no harm in a dry history lesson, but Pollard may have hoped to achieve more than that.

Kunbi Tinuoye, writing for the Griot, described the film as a "powerful documentary" that "challenges the widely held belief that the enslavement of African-Americans ended with President Abraham Lincoln's Emancipation Proclamation in 1863."

The film was one of four projects (together with The Abolitionists, The Loving Story and Freedom Riders) included in "Created Equal: America's Civil Rights Struggle "—a nationwide community engagement initiative of the National Endowment for the Humanities and the Gilder-Lehrman Institute of American History, designed to reach 500 communities between September 2013 and extended from December 2016 to December 2018.
