= Ibstock plc =

Manufacturing Company

- Type: Public limited company
- Traded as: LSE: IBST
- Industry: Building materials
- Founded: 1899; 127 years ago
- Headquarters: Ibstock, Leicestershire, United Kingdom
- Key people: Richard Akers (Chairman); Joe Hudson (CEO)
- Products: Bricks and concrete products
- Revenue: ▲£372.1 million (2025)
- Operating income: ▼£10.0 million (2025)
- Net income: ▼£3.1 million (2025)
- Website: www.ibstock.co.uk

Ibstock plc is a British manufacturer of clay bricks and concrete products headquartered in Ibstock, Leicestershire. The company is listed on the London Stock Exchange.

== History ==
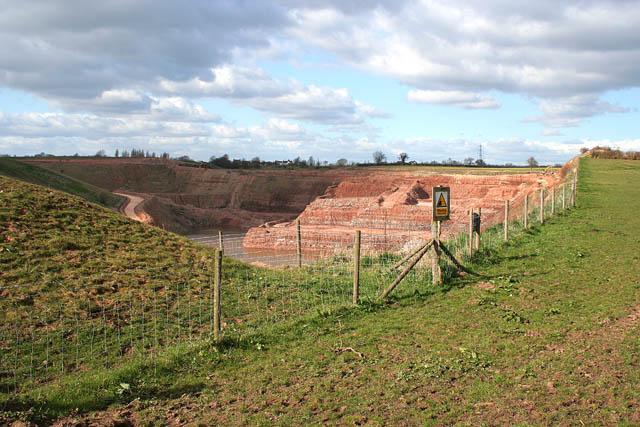
A clay pit owned by the company at Ibstock

The company originates in the brickmaking trade within the village of Ibstock in Leicestershire. It was originally registered in 1899 as Ibstock Colleries Ltd, being initially focused on coal mining; other early business interests included clay extraction and brick manufacturing. By the 1930s, brick production had gradually taken precedence over coal.

Factory at Chesterton, Staffordshire

In 1963, shortly after completing the acquisition of the Wolverhampton-based Himley Brick Company, the Ibstock Brick and Tile Company Ltd became a publicly traded company. The firm expanded rapidly during the 1960s and 1970s, particularly following its amalgamation with Johnsen, Jorgensen & Wettre Ltd to become Ibstock Johnsen Ltd; various new brick-making facilities were established along with associated services. The firm was the first brick manufacturer to provide specialist brickwork design advice through its Brickwork Design Centres that were set up in many major cities.

Throughout the 1990s, the company completed several acquisitions. In 1990 alone, Ibstock acquired the terracotta specialist Hathernware Ltd and the wet cast stone producer Ceba Ltd. However, amid depressed demand in the Early 1990s recession, the company underwent restructuring, closing several of its plants and shedding 200 jobs. By April 1993, the firm had observed a 10 percent rise in volumes and was openly planning to implement price rises on its higher-end product lines, although the firm did still record pre-tax loss of £18.7 million for that year.

In December 1994, it was announced that, on account of strengthening customer demand, one of Ibstock's plants that had been facing closure would instead be retained; one month later, the firm announced a £12 million rebuild of one of its works to improve its margins. During April 1995, Ibstock reportedly approached Tarmac Group with the aim of purchasing its UK brick business. However, later that same year, the firm decided to cut production and enact another round of job cuts amid weakening demand. During 1996, Ibstock acquired the brick manufacturing business of the distressed building materials company Redland in exchange for £160 million; around the same time, it also sold six of its existing factories to ease concerns pertaining to competition.

During March 1998, Ibstock recorded annual pre-tax profits of £23.5 million, a three-fold increase over the year prior; this was largely attributed to the Redland Brick acquisition. In December of that year, the international building materials firm CRH purchased a majority stake in Ibstock in exchange for £326 million; Two months later, the firm sold its stake in the Portuguese building materials firm Caima Ceramica e Servicos for £21.6 million. In July 1999, it acquired the brick operations of Hepworth via a £10.8 million deal.

During February 2015, Ibstock was acquired by the US-based private investment specialist Bain Capital as part of a £414 million management buyout; it was then the subject of an initial public offering, which valued the firm at around £770 million, during October 2015. Bain Capital divested its remaining 25 per cent stake in Ibstock in exchange for £218 million in April 2017.
