= NATS Holdings =

Main air navigation service provider in the United Kingdom

NATS Holdings Limited
- Type: Public-private partnership
- Industry: Air travel and airports
- Genre: Information Services
- Predecessor: NATCS
- Founded: 1962
- Headquarters: Whiteley, England, United Kingdom
- Number of locations: London Area Control Centre and London Terminal Control Centre at Swanwick, Area Control at Prestwick, and air traffic control services at UK airports, as well as offices in Dubai and Singapore
- Area served: UK and Gibraltar airspace
- Key people: Martin Rolfe (CEO)
- Services: International air traffic services and consultancy
- Number of employees: 4,227 (2021)
- Subsidiaries: NATS En-Route PLC; NATS Services Ltd
- Website: www.nats.aero

NATS Holdings, formally National Air Traffic Services (NATS), provides en-route air traffic control services to flights within the UK flight information regions and the Shanwick Oceanic Control Area. It also provides air traffic control services to 16 UK airports, and 1 British Overseas Territory.

The company's en-route business is regulated and operated under licence from the Civil Aviation Authority (CAA).

== History ==
The organisation was originally set up as the National Air Traffic Control Services (NATCS) in 1962, bringing together responsibility for the UK's existing military and civil air traffic control services.

The organisation became National Air Traffic Services (NATS) when the responsibility for sponsoring the civil air traffic service component was transferred to the newly formed Civil Aviation Authority (CAA) in 1972. Before this it had no legal existence – all contracts were with the CAA or MoD.

Until its establishment as a separate company, the leadership of NATS (the "Controller") alternated between civil and military, the latter normally a serving air marshal. The first controller was Sir Laurence Sinclair, exceptionally a retired air vice marshal. NATS staff were drawn from and paid by, the CAA and the MoD.

In 1992 it was recognised by the Government that as a service provider, NATS should be operated at some distance from its regulator, the CAA. Although debated, it was decided that NATS should not be privatised at that time. NATS was re-organised into a limited company on 1 April 1996 and became a wholly owned subsidiary of the CAA. The direct involvement of military officers in the management of NATS ended at that time, although the last military controller, Air Marshal Sir Thomas Stonor, had retired in 1991.

In 1998, a public-private partnership was proposed. This was written into the Transport Act 2000 and in 2001 51% of NATS was transferred to the private sector. However, due to the decline in air traffic following the 11 September 2001 attacks an additional investment of £130m was required, £65m coming each from the UK government and BAA, which received 4% of the company in return.

As a public-private partnership the UK government holds 49% and a golden share, with 42% held by the Airline Group, 5% by NATS staff, and 4% by UK airport operator LHR Airports Ltd.

NATS headquarters is located at Whiteley, Fareham, in Hampshire, England.

== Structure ==
The workforce of NATS includes air traffic controllers (ATCOs), air traffic control engineers (ATCEs), air traffic services assistants (ATSAs) and science technical analytical and research staff (STARs). Administrative and support staff make up the remainder of the 4,200 or so employees of NATS. Martin Rolfe became CEO of NATS in May 2015.

NATS is split into two main service provision companies: NATS En-Route PLC (NERL) and NATS Services Ltd (NSL).

- NERL is the sole provider of civilian en-route air traffic control over the UK and is regulated by the CAA which, for example, determines the charges NERL can make. NERL is funded by Eurocontrol route charges for the provision of air traffic services.
- NSL competes for contracts to provide air traffic control at airports in the UK and overseas, as well as providing related services including engineering, consultancy, information services, and training.

== Operations ==
In 2025 it handled 2,536,156 flights in UK airspace, an increase of 2.7% year-on-year since 2019. It was its busiest year since 2019 with its busiest day, 18 July, seeing 8,340 flights.

=== En-route control centres ===
There are two control locations in the UK operated by NERL:

- London Area Control Centre and London Terminal Control Centre at Swanwick in Hampshire control both upper level en-route traffic across England and Wales up to the Scottish border and low-level traffic around London and South East England, including aircraft making approaches to the main London airports.
- The Prestwick Centre, Ayrshire, is home to the Scottish Area Control Centre (including, since January 2010, the former Manchester Area Control Centre), which controls traffic over Scotland, Northern Ireland, and up to FL285 over the northern half of England, and the Prestwick Oceanic Area Control Centre which provides a procedural control service for traffic crossing the North Atlantic via the Shanwick Oceanic Control Area.

Various radar stations are operated around the UK, one such being that on Great Dun Fell in Cumbria.

=== Airport services ===
The airports service line provides air traffic services at 16 UK airports, and 1 British Overseas Territory:

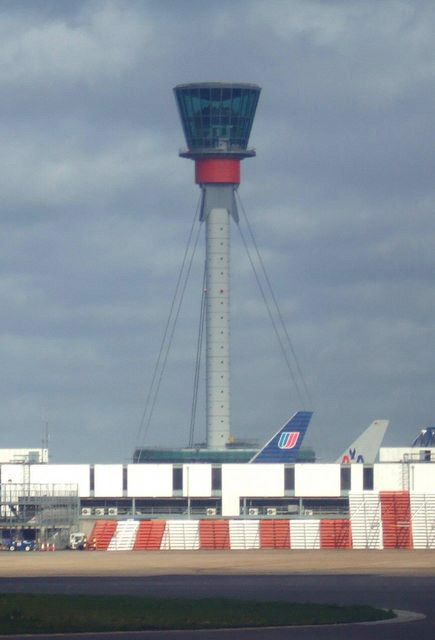
Heathrow Airport ATC tower

- Heathrow Airport
- Southampton Airport
- Gatwick Airport
- Aberdeen Airport
- Birmingham Airport
- London City Airport
- Luton Airport
- London Stansted Airport
- Cardiff Airport
- St Athan Airport
- Bristol Airport
- Farnborough Airport
- Manchester Airport
- Belfast International Airport
- Belfast City Airport
- Glasgow Airport
- Gibraltar International Airport
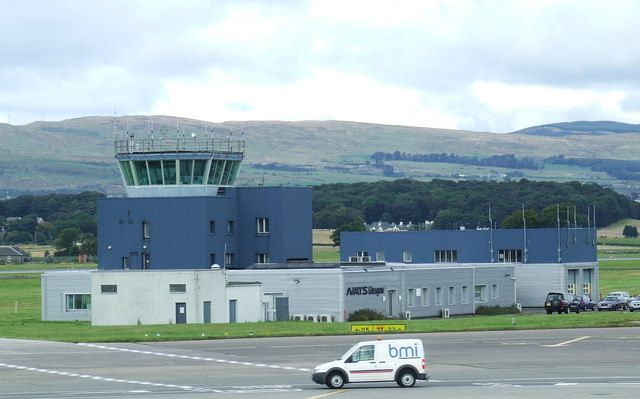
  Glasgow Airport ATC Tower

NATS also provides ATC secondments to the following airports:

- Hong Kong International Airport

NATS has also won contracts to provide air traffic control engineering services at certain airports including:

- London Biggin Hill Airport
- Oxford Airport
- Highlands and Islands Airports

NATS also provides services to the Ministry of Defence (MoD), via Qinetiq, for air traffic and range air control services at a number of UK ranges, including:

- MOD Aberporth
- MOD Hebrides
- Larkhill Garrison
- MOD West Freugh

NATS also provides services to the MoD's Military Aviation Authority.

Aberdeen NSL provides air traffic services on behalf of NERL to offshore helicopters operating primarily from Aberdeen, Shetland (Sumburgh), Humberside Airport, Norwich Airport and North Denes.

=== Defence ===
NATS helps the military around the world share airspace with civil aviation for commercial, political and environmental reasons. Services NATS provides include:

- Aeronautical data
- Defence consulting
- En route
- Military Terminal ATC provision
- Surveillance

==== Aquila ====
Aquila is a joint venture between NATS and Thales responsible for delivering the UK's Marshall program to transform terminal air traffic management at military airfields. Marshall seeks to ensure a safe, efficient and sustainable air traffic management (ATM) service for the UK armed forces. It will modernise ATM at over 100 MoD locations, in the UK and overseas, including more than 60 airfields and ranges.

Aquila is tasked to deliver a system-wide modernisation and rationalisation of the current fragmented system, and establish a flexible ATM service which is future-proofed to meet potential changes in the regulatory and technological landscape.

=== Engineering ===
Engineering services NATS provides include:

- Control centre systems
- Airport technology

=== Consultancy ===
- Airspace design
- Capacity planning
- Environmental reporting
- Occupational Health
- Runway capacity studies
- Strategy and business planning
- Safety management and human factors
- Technology and projects

=== Information services ===
Services provided by NATS include:

- Aeronautical charting
- Aeronautical Information Management (AIM)
- Procedure design
- Surveillance data
- Target Start Approval Time (TSAT)
- Wind farms planning and consultancy

=== Former operations ===
==== En-route control centres ====
The London Air Traffic Control Centre at RAF West Drayton opened in 1966 and provided ATC services until it closed in 2007, with the move to Swanwick.

Scottish air traffic control has been carried out from Atlantic House in Prestwick since 1978. This situation changed with the opening of the Prestwick Centre in 2010, to which all operational services were transferred from the old Atlantic House along with the functions carried out at the Manchester Area Control Centre which subsequently closed.

==== Airport services ====
NATS, through its airports service line, established an alliance with Spanish partner Ferrovial in 2011, forming FerroNATS, which provides air traffic control (ATC) services at nine airports across Spain: Alicante, Valencia, Ibiza, Sabadell, Sevilla, Jerez, Melilla, Madrid Cuatro Vientos, Vigo and A Coruña airports in Spain. FerroNATS was awarded the contract to provide services at these airports through a competitive tender process run by the Spanish aviation authority, AENA. All nine operational handovers were completed between November 2012 and January 2014. In February 2023 FerroNATS was sold to Portobello Capital and renamed Skyway.

== Associations and alliances with other organisations ==
NATS is a full member of the Single European Sky ATM Research (SESAR) joint undertaking, and a member of the SESAR Deployment Alliance, a cross-industry partnership made up of four airline groups, operators of 25 airports and 11 air traffic control providers. The SESAR Deployment Alliance was appointed to the role of SESAR Deployment Manager by the European Commission in December 2014 and will help to co-ordinate and synchronise the modernisation of Europe's air traffic management system.

NATS is a founding member of two of Europe's leading ANSP Alliances – the A6 Alliance and the Borealis Alliance.

The A6 is an alliance of some of the main European Air Navigation Service Providers (ANSPs). Its aim is to help drive the modernisation of the European ATM network within the SESAR programme for the benefit of customers. The A6 members are full members of the SESAR Joint Undertaking and are part of the SESAR Deployment Alliance, which was recently appointed SESAR Deployment Manager by the European Commission.

The Borealis Alliance is an alliance of Air Navigation Service Providers (ANSPs). The Alliance includes the ANSPs of Denmark, Estonia, Finland, Iceland, Ireland, Latvia, Norway, Sweden and the UK. The Borealis Alliance is currently working on a major programme to deliver free route airspace across the whole of Northern Europe by 2020.

Since the 1940s, the Irish and UK air traffic control service providers have worked effectively together. This was further strengthened in July 2008 when the UK and Ireland launched the first operational Functional Airspace Block, often referred to in the industry as FAB, under the European Commission's Single European Sky initiative.

NATS is a full member of the Civil Air Navigation Services Organisation (CANSO), an international association of companies that provide air traffic control services.

NATS is a shareholder in European Satellite Services Provider (ESSP), a company set up to operate the European Geostationary Navigation Overlay Service (EGNOS).

NATS is primarily known for the air traffic services it provides in the UK but also works internationally providing air traffic and consultancy services in over 30 countries, working with many different organisations in Europe and beyond, including Singapore, the United States and Qatar.

== Notable incidents ==
It failed on several occasions between January and September 2002 for various reasons.

From 15 to 20 April 2010, under internationally agreed guidelines that require a zero tolerance approach to ash, NATS placed a series of restrictions on aircraft operating in UK controlled airspace owing to the potential dangers caused by a volcanic ash cloud from the eruption of Icelandic volcano Eyjafjallajökull, in cooperation with the Met Office, CAA and UK government.

On 12 December 2014, from 15:30 until 16:30, traffic flow throughout the London airspace was restricted due to a computer system failure at NATS. At 15:30 an announcement was made by Eurocontrol that "There has been a failure of the flight data computer server at London ACC [area control centre]." At 16:30 the airspace was reopened, however it remained restricted with some landing flights being turned away. NATS reported that the failure was due to a single faulty line of software source code. The failure was examined in the House of Commons Transport Select Committee on 17 December 2014.

On 28 August 2023 NATS suffered a major technical incident, caused by receipt of a flight plan containing duplicate codes for different navigation beacons, that caused severe delays. It occurred on the busiest day of the year. The incident lasted approximately 3 hours, but caused extensive knock-on delays. 790 flights departing UK airports and 785 flights arriving into UK airports were cancelled, representing about 27% of all flights. The following day at least 281 flights were cancelled.

A major radar failure at the Swanwick centre caused heavy disruption on 30 July 2025.

On 8 September 2026, technical issues with NATS caused major disruption at several UK airports including London Heathrow Airport and London Stansted Airport, resulting in some 349 British Airways flights being cancelled, and others diverted to airports including Paris Charles de Gaulle Airport, Amsterdam Schiphol Airport and Brussels Airport. A further 291 flights are also cancelled the next day. Transport Secretary Heidi Alexander said she did "not believe the issue was unavoidable" and gave chief executive, Martin Rolfe, a week to report back on the reasons for the technical failure. A preliminary report, published on 18 September, said the incident was caused by a defect in software which allocates codes to individual aircraft when manual requests are made. It stated: "While a manual request for an aircraft code was being processed, the system received a message for a higher priority activity which resulted in the aircraft code request being paused. When processing of the aircraft code request resumed, the software defect meant it did not resume correctly and the resulting output was corrupted, and affected some subsequent flight data updates. This happened in the space of a millisecond."

On 21 September 2026, a problem at the Prestwick centre, unrelated to a software issue on 8 September, led to the cancellation of about 200 flights. The problem, which was fixed after a few hours, was attributed to "connectivity issue" in the systems network.

== See also ==
- History of air traffic control in the United Kingdom
- Linesman/Mediator
