= NATS Swanwick =

UK air traffic control facility

Coordinates: 50.8868°N 1.2861°W

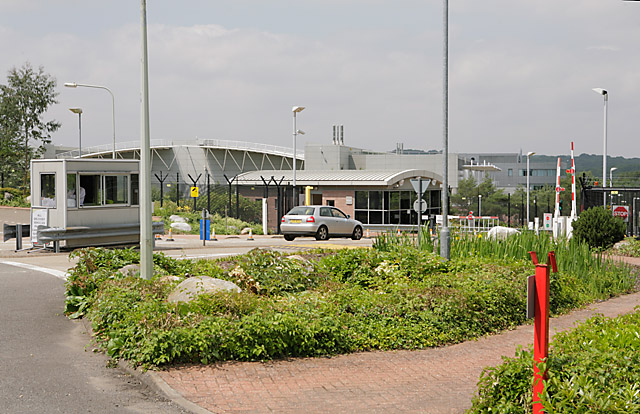
NATS London Area Control Centre, Swanwick

NATS Swanwick is a combined area control centre and terminal control centre operated by National Air Traffic Services (NATS) at Swanwick in Hampshire, England.

It started operations on 27 January 2002, and handles aircraft in the London flight information region (FIR), which covers most of England and Wales. The centre consists of three facilities:

- The London Area Control Centre (LACC), which provides air traffic control services to aircraft operating in upper airspace over England and Wales within the London FIR.
- The London Terminal Control Centre (LTCC), which controls aircraft flying below 24,500ft flying to and from London's airports.
- No. 78 Squadron of the RAF, which provides military air traffic control services and distress and diversion services to civilian aircraft.

The Swanwick facility replaces that of the former site at West Drayton.
