= Swanwick, Hampshire =

Village in Hampshire, England

Coordinates: 50.8813°N 1.268°W

Swanwick
- Location within Hampshire
- OS grid reference: SU5109
- District: Fareham
- Shire county: Hampshire
- Region: South East
- Country: England
- Sovereign state: United Kingdom
- Post town: SOUTHAMPTON
- Postcode district: SO31
- Dialling code: 01489
- Police: Hampshire and Isle of Wight
- Fire: Hampshire and Isle of Wight
- Ambulance: South Central
- UK Parliament: Hamble Valley

Swanwick (/ˈswɒnɪk/) is a village in Hampshire, England, east of the River Hamble and north of the M27 motorway. The village is located within the borough of Fareham and is the site of the London Area Control Centre (LACC) and the London Terminal Control Centre (LTCC), part of National Air Traffic Services Air Traffic Control Centre, and Bursledon Brickworks, the last remaining example of a Victorian steam-powered brickworks.

Swanwick has no real village centre and the only commercial premises of note is the Elm Tree Public House. Since the 1980s, the gradual spread of housing developments has meant that Swanwick has partly merged with the new development of Whiteley although the only direct vehicular access is via Yew Tree Drive (once a bus only route).

Swanwick railway station on the West Coastway Line is approximately one mile south of the village and is nearer Park Gate than Swanwick.

The village's "twin" Lower Swanwick is situated two miles west of the village on the edge of the River Hamble.

== History ==
Human activity at Swanwick dates back to the Bronze Age. It is understood that a ritual from the era involved the digging of shafts or wells to the underworld; one such shaft at Swanwick was found to contain 20 cylindrical loom-weights and a wooden post with organic residues believed to be the remains of flesh and blood. A refuse pit dating from Roman times has also been found at Swanwick.

In the autumn of 877 AD Alfred the Great blockaded the city of Exeter in order to capture the band of pagans there; some of the pagans fled by sea and were pursued by king's ships to Swanwick where the pagans' boats were sunk after a month at sea. Some historians have debated whether this was at Swanwick in Hampshire, or a coastal settlement called Sanewick in Dorset. Some accounts indicate that the pagans, who were Danish, lost some 120 vessels at Swanwick.

The Post Office Directory of 1855 listed Swanwick as a hamlet within the parish of Titchfield (itself the largest parish in the county of Hampshire at the time). The hamlet had an independent chapel and four residents were listed: a gentleman by the name of William B Gates, a farmer (John Crosskey), a blacksmith (Richard Hewett) and a grocer (Thomas Privett).

Around the beginning of the 20th century the area around Swanwick was noted for its strawberry beds. Strawberry farming remained a feature of the area, and in 1961 strawberries from Swanwick were being cooled immediately after picking as an experimental way of retaining quality and freshness for longer. Swanwick's cooled strawberries were being transported to markets as far away as Leeds, Manchester and Glasgow.

The air traffic area control centre at Swanwick was brought into operation in 2002. A control centre for London City Airport, 80 miles (130 km) away, was added in January 2021 using a remotely operated digital system.

== Landmarks ==
The area houses Bursledon Brickworks Museum and Swanwick Lakes Nature Reserve. The Brickworks Museum, also known as 'Bursledon Brickworks', is a volunteer-run museum; it is purportedly the UK's sole surviving Victorian steam-driven brickworks. The nature reserve is an area of about 80 acres, that was formed from clay pit excavations. Owned by NATS, the site is managed by the Hampshire and Isle of Wight Wildlife Trust and is a Site of Nature Conservation Interest. Both NATS and the Nature Reserve formed part of the original brickworks.
