= Durrington-on-Sea =

Durrington-on-Sea may refer to:

- Durrington, a suburb of Worthing, West Sussex
- Durrington-on-Sea railway station, the station serving Durrington
