= Darrington =

Darrington or Darington, may refer to:

== Places ==
- Darrington, West Yorkshire, England, UK
- Darrington, Washington, United States
- Memorial Unit, a prison in Texas, United States formerly known as the Darrington Unit

== People ==
- Denton Darrington (born 1940), American politician
- Michael Darrington, British businessman
- Mike Darrington (born 1931), English snooker player
- Pamela Darington, cofounder of the Andean music band Inkuyo
- Darrington Sentimore (born 1990), American football player
- Darington Hobson (born 1987), American basketball player

== Other uses ==
- Darington (character), a fictional character from the 2010s U.S. animated TV show Blaze and the Monster Machines
- Peter Darington, a fictional character created by Douglas Valder Duff for his eponymous 1940 novel Peter Darington

== See also ==
- Peter Darington, 1940 novel by Douglas Valder Duff
- Durrington (disambiguation)
