= Douglas Valder Duff =

British merchant seaman, officer, and author (1901–1978)

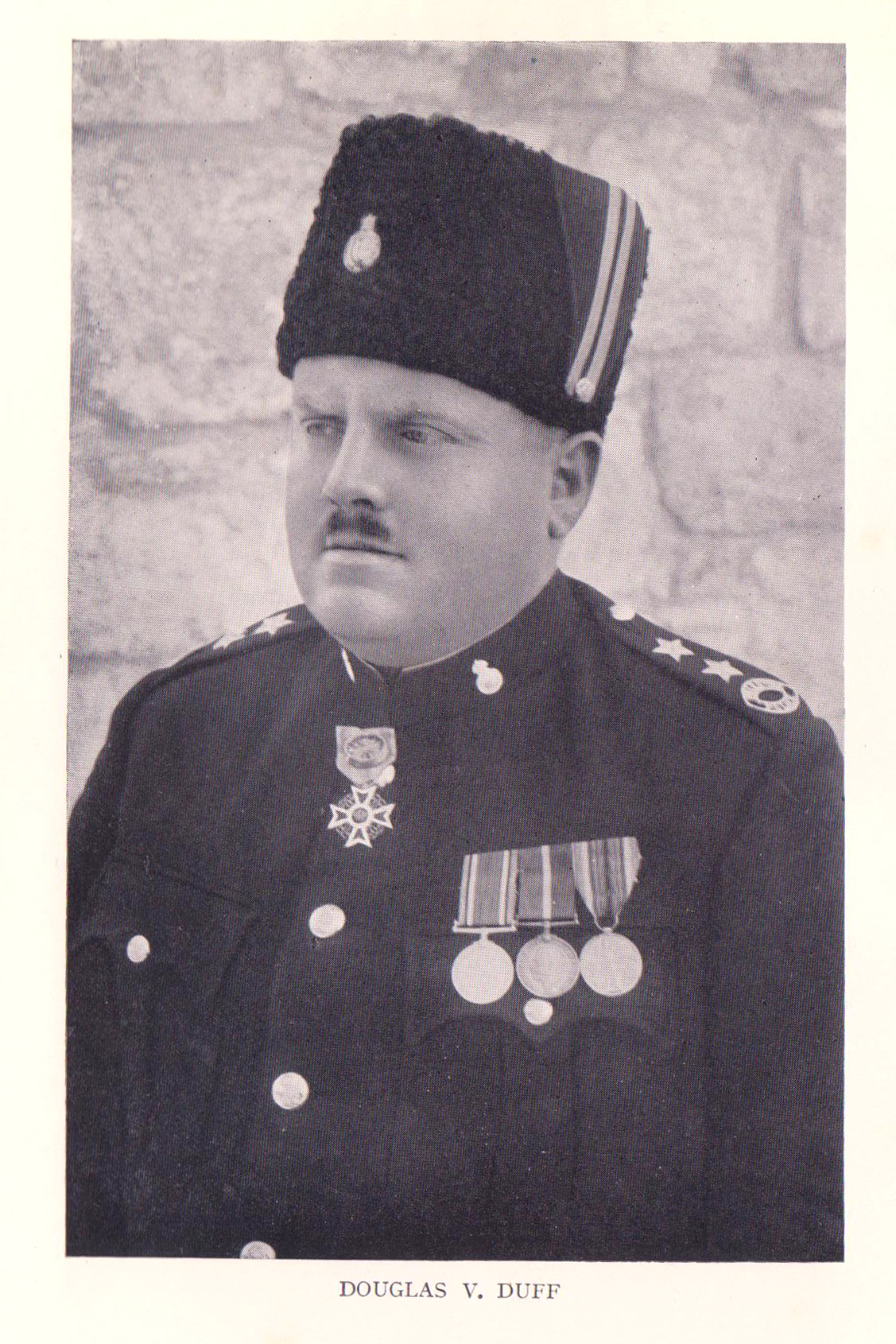
Douglas V. Duff

Douglas Valder Duff DSC (1901, Rosario de Santa Fe, Argentina – 23 September 1978, Dorchester, England) was a British merchant seaman, Royal Navy officer, police officer, and author of over 100 books, including memoirs and books for children.

Douglas was the eldest son of Arthur Joseph Duff, then British Consul in Rosario, and Florence Valder.

Duff served in the Merchant Navy during World War I, and survived being torpedoed on two occasions. He later rescued White Russian refugees from the Black Sea, spent time as an apprentice monk, served as a 'Black and Tan' during the counter-insurgency in Ireland, and joined the Palestine Police. After further naval service in World War II, he became a successful broadcaster.

== Service in the Great War ==
In 1914, Duff entered the naval training college HMS Conway aged 13 and served in the Merchant Navy in World War I. He served first on the freighter Thracia, and saw action using its deck gun against a German U-boat which was subsequently sunk by a French destroyer. On 26 March 1917, the ship carrying a cargo of 4,000 tons of iron ore was sunk by a German U-boat.

Midshipman Duff, aged 16, was the only survivor of a crew of 37. Seventeen months later he was a member of the crew of the passenger ship Flavia carrying American nurses and Serbian cavalrymen serving in the American army. It was also torpedoed and sunk. One passenger was drowned but several hundred horses were lost. Duff had to kill several horses with his revolver in order to stop them swamping his lifeboat.

Duff served on a third ship carrying American troops across the Atlantic which was wracked with Spanish flu that killed dozens of its passengers. Duff suffered a broken leg as a result of a U-boat attack. After the Armistice Duff took part in the rescue of White Russian refugees from the Black Sea and was appalled by the sight of destitute Russian noblewomen trading sexual favours with the crew in exchange for food and accommodation in their bunks. He referred to his experiences during this period as 'indescribable'.

=== Period in monastery ===
Whilst alone in the water following the sinking of the Thracia he promised to himself he would become a monk if he survived the ordeal. Following the end of World War I he entered a monastery near Spalding, Lincolnshire, as Brother Lawrence. However he became increasingly disillusioned by monastic life due to personality clashes with the senior monks and his revulsion at their brutal treatment of the novices.

== Service in the "Black and Tans" ==
After two years in the monastery Duff left to serve as an auxiliary policeman in the famous counter-terrorism force the "Black and Tans" during the Irish War of Independence of 1920 to 1921.

On enlistment Duff lied about his military background claiming to have served in the Rifle Brigade in order to spare himself an extended period of police training in depot. He was quickly involved in combat against the Irish Republican Army (IRA), and shot his way out of two ambushes, resulting in the deaths of a pair of insurgents who had attacked his unit with grenades. He later took part in a huge firefight involving up to an estimated hundred insurgents and police officers. The ambushers were driven off by the police using a machine gun-equipped armoured car.

Whilst off duty he claimed to have confronted a man he suspected of being IRA leader Michael Collins in a Dublin street. The man indicated he was correct in his suspicions but alleged that several men lounging nearby were his armed bodyguards who would kill Duff if he attempted to take him prisoner. Not carrying his sidearm off duty, Duff allowed the man to depart and reported his encounter to Dublin Castle intelligence.

By 1921, Duff was employed using his maritime training to lead small boat raids against groups of fugitive IRA members who had sought sanctuary in remote coastal villages inaccessible by road. At the time of the eventual truce Duff was relieving a small force of Royal Marines who were besieged in a lighthouse.

Duff was horrified by the terms of the ceasefire as he considered the rebellion practically crushed and referred to the London government as a 'junta' for agreeing to it. In his autobiography, Duff writes proudly of his police colleagues referring to them as 'some of the finest sons of Empire' and was ardent in his support for reprisals against the IRA and their supporters.

== Palestine ==
Duff joined what was to become the Palestine Police Force in 1922. Morale was low amongst the many recruits who were veterans from World War I and the conflicts in Ireland and Russia. On the voyage from Britain to Palestine Duff became involved in a quasi-mutiny over pay and conditions aboard their transport ship. He reminded his commanding officer that many of the cadet constables possessed their own private weapons obtained during their wartime service and that he was perfectly capable of taking command of the vessel if need be.

The newly formed gendarmerie was based at Sarafand. From Sarafand Duff was stationed in Nazareth before being moved to Haifa where he became a member of the Palestine Port Police. Their main task was intercepting smugglers of tobacco (Lattakia) and hashish. Duff commanded patrol boats on security duties and on one occasion went undercover in Beirut to entrap a drug smuggling ring. They also supervised the arrival of Zionist immigrants whose quarantine camp, beside the Kishon River, was harsh and many of the occupants contracted malaria. He describes Haifa in 1923 as being like the "Wild West", "Many Englishmen lived openly with native women, some foolish enough to marry them."

In 1926 he was promoted to Inspector based at the Police HQ on Mount Scopus. He had responsibility for policing Jerusalem and Bethlehem. The most important events of the year were Christmas Eve and Easter which involved the Eastern Orthodox Sabt an-Nur, (Day of Holy Fire) and the an-Nabi Musa Muslim celebrations.

He was in Jerusalem on 11 July 1927 when Palestine was shaken by a severe earthquake that killed 150 people in the district. He describes the sound of people screaming coming from the Old City. He was sent to Jericho to assist with rescue attempts and then to Nablus to retrieve the dead.

He was at the centre of what became known as the Western Wall controversy in 1928, when following an order from the Chief Commissioner, Mr Keith Roach, his men removed a screen that worshippers had put up against the Wailing Wall. During the inquiry into his actions he was transferred, as commander, to Megiddo Prison. His staff consisted of one Jewish deputy officer and 45 Arab policemen in charge of 500 convicts. He was in Meggido when the 1929 pogroms broke out and assisted the kibbutz of Mishmar Ha'Emek which came under attack from local Bedouin. It was at this time he first contracted malaria.

From Megiddo he moved to the command of Acre Prison. In 1931 Duff became commander of Tulkarm district which was rife with feuds, highway robberies and attacks on Jewish colonies. According to his account he retired the following year due to severe recurrences of malaria. Other sources say he was dismissed for the ill treatment of prisoners and that his name was the source of the slang expression "to duff up" someone.

During his decade of service in Palestine Duff attended 17 executions. It is not clear whether he was commander of Acre prison on 17 June 1930 when three Arab men involved in the 1929 rioting were hanged.

In his 1938 account of his month-long pilgrimage to Palestine he writes as if it was his first visit and identifies himself as a Mr Harding. Set in spring 1937 he gives an account of a man-hunt with dogs across the Carmel hills which ended with the fugitive being shot dead and the houses he was seen running away from being blown up by the British Royal Engineers. Travel of all civilian traffic around Galilee was in convoys led by British armoured cars. In Acre and Nablus he was advised not to enter the town alone. He was searched by the army at a checkpoint on the road from Bireh to Jerusalem. He had to wait for an army escort to take him round the city walls from the Damascus Gate to the Jaffa Gate. At night in the Old City there was the regular sound of gunfire. During the day the streets were patrolled by the army. He was only able to visit Bethlehem by joining an Army patrol which took him to Hebron and Beersheba returning via Bayt Jibrin. In Jerusalem he witnessed a bomb being thrown at a Jewish bus. The book is dominated by his spiritual journey which reaches its climax in the Holy Sepulchre.

== Semi-retirement and writing career ==
In 1932 Duff married nurse Janet Wallace, who had reputedly fended off an attack on her Nazareth hospital using only a broom. Plagued by recurring bouts of malaria, Duff left the police and set up home in Dorset, where he took up a career in journalism, drawing on his own experiences to write adventure stories for boys. In 1940 Peter Darington – seaman detective – appeared. There was also Harding of the Palestine Police (1941) and Bill Beringer – detective – (1949) who appeared in a long running series, as did Adam Macadam – Naval cadet – (1957).

=== Service in World War II ===
On the outbreak of the Second World War Duff joined the Royal Naval Volunteer Reserve (RNVR), and served in Dover. He would later serve in the Middle East, including a period on the Staff of Admiral Cunningham and commanding blockade runners breaking the siege of Tobruk. In March 1941 he was awarded a Mention in Dispatches (MID) for his service aboard HM Yacht Eskimo off the Libyan coast, and eventually commanded patrol ship HMS Stag, netting the Suez Canal. In 1943 he returned to the UK, where he joined the Irregular Warfare Department of the Admiralty based in Teignmouth. He was demobilised in 1945 with the rank of lieutenant commander.

=== Post World War II career ===
Duff's first wife, Janet, died in 1960 and he later married Eveline Rowston, another nurse. He continued writing for the rest of his life and became a popular broadcaster on radio and television, and a regular panellist on the long running television show What's My Line?.

He died in Dorchester, Dorset, in 1978 and was survived by his daughters Jean and Elizabeth.

== Books ==
Duff produced nearly 100 books in his lifetime, sometimes writing under pseudonyms, including Douglas Stanhope, Leslie Savage and Peter Wickloe. His books were invariably based on his own life story and were normally a combination of nautical adventures and police/detective work featuring heroes such as Peter Harrington, Bill Berenger, Jack Harding and the Sea Whelps. In later years he would branch off into science fiction stories such as 'The Sky Pirates', 'The Man From Outer Space' and 'The Nuclear Castle'. He contributed to 'The Boys Own Paper' and 'The Wide World' magazine as well as historical works such as 'Nine Famous Stories of Sieges and Escapes' and 'The Story of the Merchant Navy' and non-fiction such as 'Ships of the World'. He also produced three volumes of autobiography, Sword for Hire 1934, May the Winds Blow 1948 and Bailing with a Tea Spoon 1953.

- Sword for Hire: The Saga of a Modern Free-Companion, John Murray, London, 1934
- Palestine Picture, Hodder & Stoughton, London, 1936
- Duff, D.V. (1938). Palestine Unveiled. Glasgow: Blackie & Son Ltd.
- Duff, D.V. (1959). Bailing With A Teaspoon. John Long Limited.

=== Bibliography ===
- Horne, Edward, A Job Well Done: A History of the Palestine Police Force, 1920–1948. (Book Guild 2003) ISBN 1-85776-758-6.
- Tamari, Salim & Nassar, Issam, The Storyteller of Jerusalem. The life and Times of Wasif Jawhariyyeh, 1904–1948 (Olive Branch Press 2014) ISBN 978-1-56656-925-5.
