= Durrington =

Durrington may refer to:

== Places in England ==
- Durrington, West Sussex, a suburb of Worthing
  - Durrington-on-Sea railway station
  - RAF Durrington, World War II radar station
- Durrington, Wiltshire, a village and parish
  - Durrington Walls, a prehistoric henge monument

== Other uses ==
- Durrington grass, a grass, also known as Axonopus fissifolius
- Durrington Windmill, post mill in High Salvington, Sussex, England
- Trent Durrington (born 1975), Australian baseball player

== See also ==
- Darrington (disambiguation)
