= RAF Sopley =

Military base in England

RAF Sopley
- Near Sopley, Hampshire in England

Site information
- Type: RAF Radar centre
- Owner: Ministry of Defence
- Operator: Royal Air Force

Location
- Shown within Hampshire RAF Sopley (the United Kingdom)
- Coordinates: 50.779°N 1.771°W

Site history
- Built: 1942
- In use: 1943-1974

Royal Air Force Sopley or more simply RAF Sopley is a former Royal Air Force Second World War Radar station, codenamed Starlight, near the village of Sopley, Hampshire, England. The radar station was opened in December 1940. In 1959 it became an air traffic control radar station, and finally closed on 27 September 1974. Nearby Sopley Camp was built in the early 1950s as a domestic site for the radar station and is probably best known as the initial home of the Vietnamese boat people, in 1979.

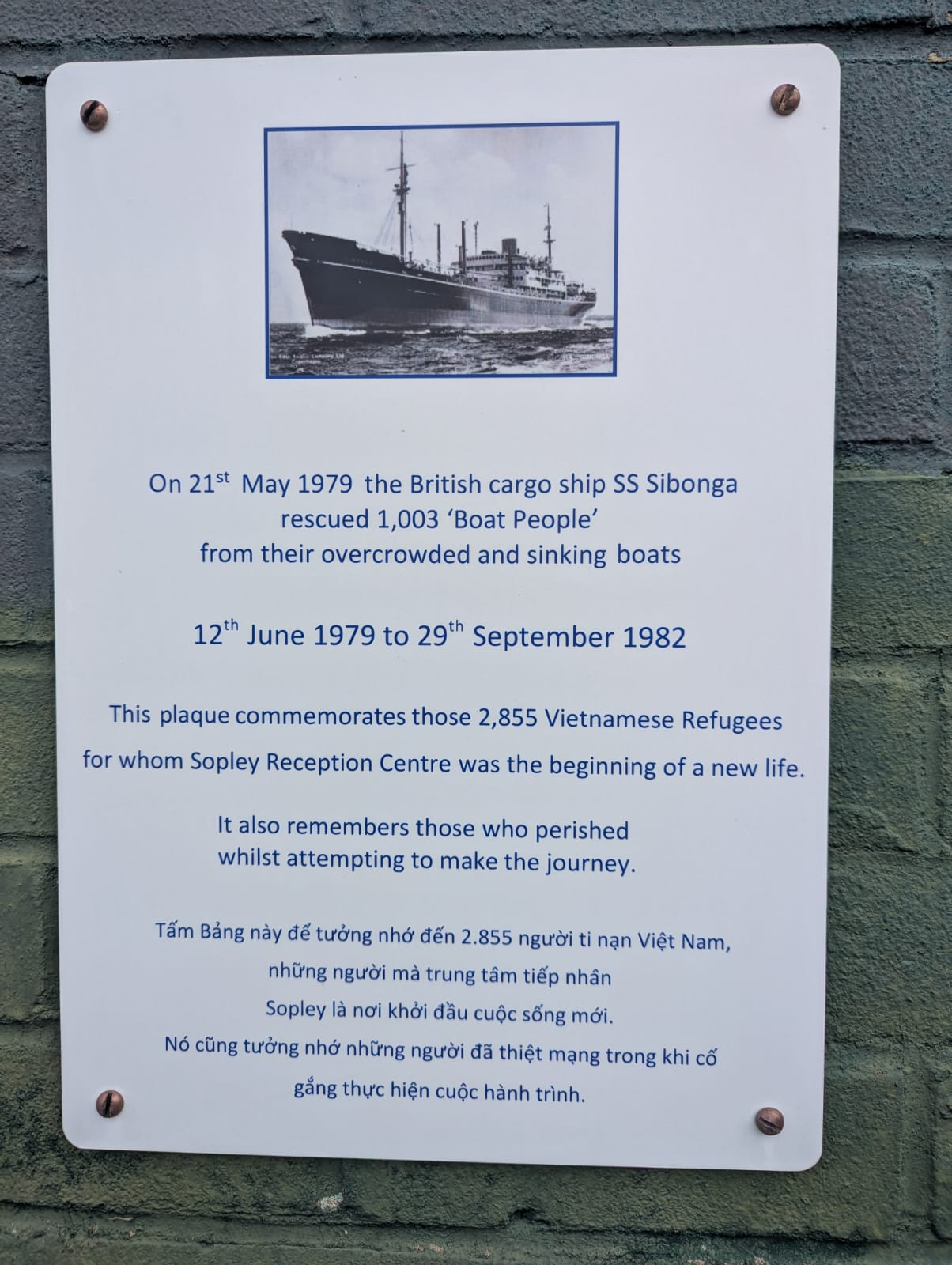
Placard at former barracks at RAF Sopley, in 2025

The camp was sold in 1993 to a local partnership under the name Merryfield Park. Most of the old barracks site had been redeveloped as housing, but the two-storey building at the Sopley end has been converted into a museum and education centre by Friends of New Forest Airfields (FONFA). The museum opened in May 2016.

== History ==
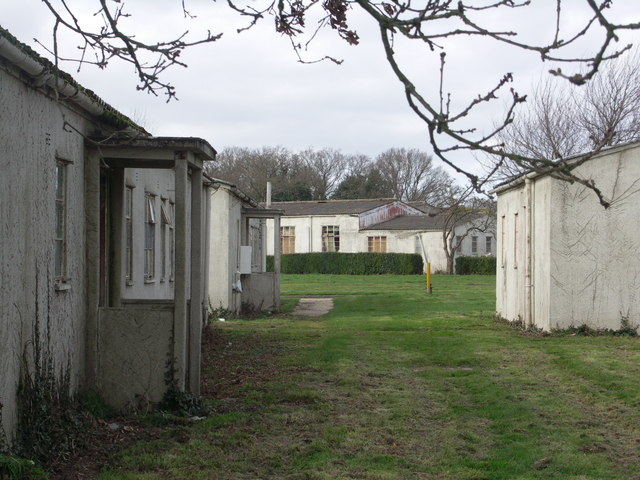
The barracks at RAF Sopley, in 2007

The site started out as an experimental Ground Controlled Interception (GCI) radar station. Using systems developed in nearby Christchurch, a variety of lash-up systems were installed during 1940 and 1941. These were eventually put into production as the AMES Type 7, which took over most aircraft direction and interception duties from about 1942 on. Sopley received its own Type 7 in 1943. It was a permanent fixture with rotating aerial array, transmitter equipment stored in an underground bunker, operations block, emergency backup power supply and guard hut.

During the Second World War, the Sopley radar station worked with the Middle Wallop sector and RAF squadrons such as 125, 604, and 406 (Canadian) squadrons. The station was responsible for over one hundred enemy aircraft shot down between 1941 and 1945.

In 1943 an Advanced Landing Ground called RAF Winkton was constructed to the southeast of the radar station. RAF Winkton operated for less than a year and was officially closed in January 1945.

In 1946 RAF Sopley was reclassified as a master GCI station and reserve Sector Operations Centre. As part of the UK's programme to update its air defences, Sopley underwent much modernisation during the 1950s including a new guardhouse providing access to a two-storey underground operations centre. It was also in the early 1950s that the domestic camp was built near Bransgore. In 1958 the School of Fighter Control moved in and from 1959 an Air Traffic Control Research Unit was established.

The Fighter Control School disbanded in 1960 and the station was taken over by Air Traffic Control. RAF Sopley fulfilled a number of other roles before closing in September 1974. The two-level operations bunker was modernised in the 1970s when it was occupied by a Royal Signals unit from Signals Research and Development Establishment at Christchurch. The entire site transferred to the army soon after and for the duration of the Cold War was used by 2 Signals Brigade from the UK Land Forces at Wilton. The only surviving surface features of the site are the guardhouse, which has been refurbished, the generator building and a small blockhouse that doubles as an emergency exit for the bunker. The bunker too remains intact and is used by a private company for data storage.
