= Issam Nassar =

Palestinian historian and photographer

Issam Nassar (Arabic: عصام نصار), is a Palestinian historian of photography in Palestine and the Middle East. He is professor of History at Illinois State University and a research fellow at the Institute for Palestine Studies. He taught at the University of California at Berkeley in 2006; Bradley University in 2003–2006 and Al-Quds University in 1998–2003. Nassar is the co-editor of Jerusalem Quarterly (Arabic: Hawliyat al-Quds) and author of books and articles, among them Laqatat Mughayirah (Different Snapshots: The History of Early Local Photography in Palestine).
