= RAF Durrington =

World War II ground-controlled interception radar station

Coordinates: 50.8253°N 0.414°W

RAF Durrington was a World War II ground-controlled interception (GCI) radar station in Durrington, West Sussex, a neighbourhood in Worthing in England. RAF Durrington was one of six radar stations built in coastal areas in 1940 to improve the radar capability of the Royal Air Force during night bombing raids by the Axis powers.

== Current use ==
The former GCI radar station is being used as Palatine School, a school for those with special educational needs. The site underwent a major redevelopment in 2006 and was extended from the radar station building to accommodate more pupils.

== See also ==
- List of former Royal Air Force stations
